= Red Maps =

Series of foldout guides to metropolitan cities in the United States and Europe

Red Maps are a series of foldout guides to metropolitan cities in the United States and Europe. The NYC based company designs city blueprints dotted with boutiques, cafes and noteworthy sites. Red Maps contain detailed information on museums, architecture, shops, theaters and hotels. The color-coded guides include listings of cultural interest as well as restaurants, parks, popular landmarks and places of historical significance.

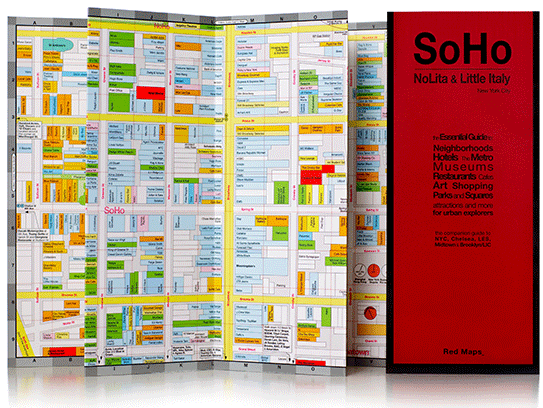
Red Map of SoHo NYC

== History ==
Jim Leniart is the owner and creator of Red Maps. He began his career in commercial real estate drawing maps for clients. Jim's decision to become a full-time cartographer led to the creation of Red Maps, which he founded in 1998. Beginning with a shopping guide to SoHo, by June 2000, two additional New York guides for Midtown and all of Manhattan, as well as maps to Los Angeles, San Francisco, Washington, D.C., and Las Vegas were completed. In April 2001, Red Maps was named one of the Best Map Guides for San Francisco by Travel + Leisure. There are over 29 Red Maps to 24 cities.

== Cities ==
Among the 24 cities that Red Maps publishes its guides for are: Chicago, Miami, London, Paris, Barcelona, Prague, New Orleans, Los Angeles, San Francisco, Rome and Milan. The New Yorker set lays out detailed block by block shopping guides and restaurants of SoHo, Nolita, Chelsea, Meatpacking District, Greenwich Village, Midtown, Brooklyn and Long Island City.

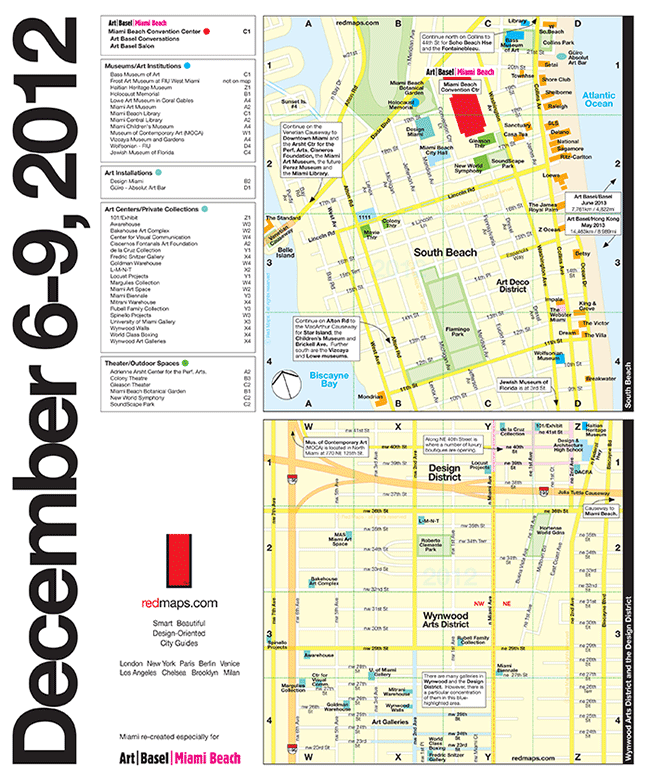
Red Map for Art Basel Miami Beach Magazine 2012

== Events ==
Red Maps was chosen to create customized guides featuring all the key venues for the Fall and Spring shows of London Fashion Week from 2007 to 2011. In 2012, a custom made map of the Lincoln Center was redrawn by Red Maps in The Manhattan of Fashion Insiders book for New York Fashion Week. Among Red Maps other custom maps and graphic design for clients are Le Bon Marche, BreakingGround, MTV Real World DC and New Orleans, Top Chef New Orleans, and Soho House New York.
