= Chinese Community Center =

Community center in New York City

Coordinates: 40°42′57.45″N 73°59′53.2″W

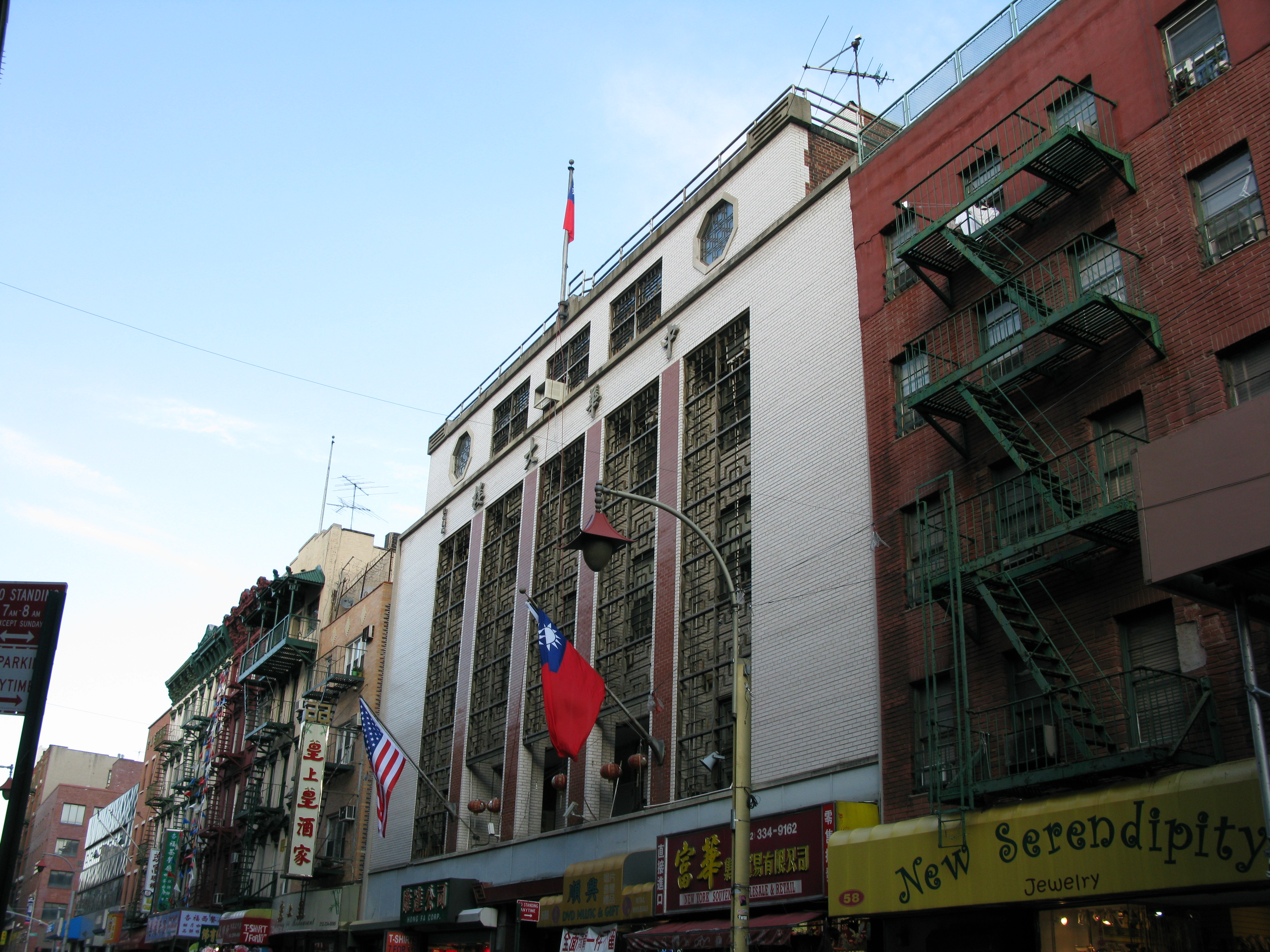
The Chinese Community Center facade, facing Mott Street. There is also an entrance at Elizabeth Street.

The Chinese Community Center at 60-64 Mott Street is home to both the Chinese Consolidated Benevolent Association (CCBA), the oldest Chinese community service organization of Chinatown established in 1883, and New York Chinese School, established in 1909 for children who came from overseas; both are located in the same Manhattan Chinatown building in New York City. The building itself is considered a Chinatown "town hall". Both the New York Chinese School and the CCBA are affiliated.

== New York Chinese School ==
New York Chinese School 紐約華僑學校

Location
- 62 Mott Street 3rd floor New York City, New York 10013; United States

Information
- Type: Non-profit 501(c)(3) Chinese school
- Motto: “Prosperity, Justice, Integrity, and Honor” (in Chinese: 禮義廉恥 — Lǐ, Yì, Lián, Chǐ).
- Established: 1909
- Principal: Jennifer Wang
- Faculty: 50
- Grades: Kindergarten 1 - High School
- Enrollment: 3,000+
- Website: nychineseschool.org

The New York Chinese School (紐約華僑學校) is a non-profit 501(c)(3) school, housed in the Chinese Community Centre. It has become so synonymous for students to say they attend Chinese school at 中華公所 instead of 紐約華僑學校. New York Chinese School (NYCS) is one of the 60 associations affiliated with the New York Chinese Consolidated Benevolent Association.It has been officially chartered by the New York State Education Department since 1967.

Being the first overseas Chinese school, NYCS initially began with only around 20 students in the early 20th century, but it has grown to over 3,000 students. It is currently the largest overseas Chinese school with an auditorium that seats over 400 people, 22 classrooms, 2 dance studios, a piano room, and a modern indoor gymnasium.

Weekday after-school classes run from 3:30pm to 6:30pm, and the more popular weekend morning and afternoon classes are held on Saturdays or Sundays from 10am-1:30pm or 2-5:30pm. Both Cantonese and Mandarin language classes are available. Historically, the majority of classes, especially upper-level classes, were taught in Cantonese, but recently Mandarin classes have outnumbered Cantonese classes by a 3:1 ratio and students studying Mandarin have outnumbered those studying Cantonese. All books provide both traditional and simplified Chinese writing, but they mainly focus on simplified writing (currently used in Taiwan in contrast to the simplified writing currently used in the PRC).

Music and art classes have been taught for many years and continue to this day. Additionally, the school has a summer camp, and adult Mandarin and Cantonese classes have opened up. Adding on, according to the website they offer coding, English + Math tutoring services, and more for K-12.

Presently, NYCS also holds competitions within classes, ceremonies, also providing scholarships and helping teenagers register in programs such as the Congressional Award.To add onto the scholarships provided, New York Chinese School has a unique system where donors, like Mr. Eric Ng (current CCBA Chairman) and Wonton Food Inc. Founded by Mr. Ching Sun Wong, fund these graduation scholarships.

NYCS is noted to have many partnerships and collaborations, from high schools, universities, and museums to food companies, initiatives, and health centers, they have worked with many different organizations, and they all work to support one another.
