= Elizabeth Street Garden =

Community garden in Manhattan, New York

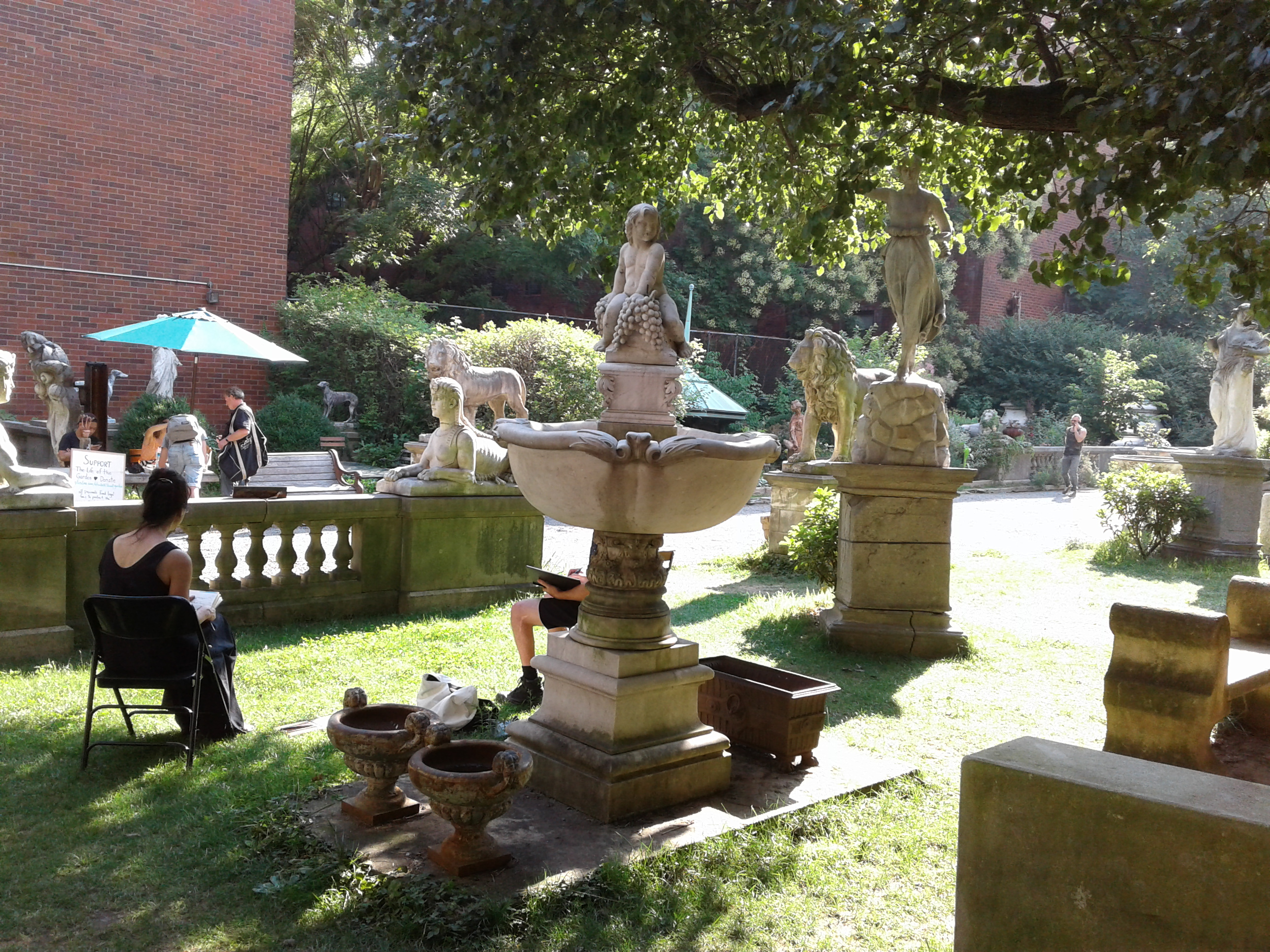
- Front entrance of garden
- Interactive map of Elizabeth Street Garden
- Location: Elizabeth Street, between Prince & Spring Streets, New York City
- Coordinates: 40°43′19.9″N 73°59′40.7″W
- Area: 1 acre (0.40 ha)
- Established: 1991
- Website: elizabethstreetgarden.com

The Elizabeth Street Garden is a one-acre (0.40 ha) community sculpture garden in the Nolita neighborhood of Manhattan, New York City. Located on Elizabeth Street between Prince and Spring Streets, the garden is owned by the city government and managed by the eponymous Elizabeth Street Garden (ESG), a 501(c)(3) nonprofit organization, and open to the public for general use and community events.

Allan Reiver, who operated the neighboring Elizabeth Street Gallery, began developing the once vacant and city-owned site as a garden in 1991. The New York City Housing Authority took over the land in 2012, later planning to develop affordable housing on the site. After a lengthy dispute over the garden, in 2024, the New York Court of Appeals ruled to allow the development. However, the city government canceled plans for development in June 2025, and Mayor Eric Adams designated the garden as a city park that November. His successor, Zohran Mamdani, indicated during his campaign that he would restart plans for development, but dropped these plans in 2026.

The Elizabeth Street Garden is featured in the 2026 documentary film The History of Concrete.

== Description ==
The Elizabeth Street Garden occupies a 1-acre (0.40 ha) L-shaped space on Elizabeth Street in the Nolita neighborhood of Manhattan in New York City, between Prince and Spring Streets. The garden is open to the public and operated by neighborhood volunteers year-round, with free public events throughout the year.

The garden includes various sculptures, many of which are taken from the collection of Allan Reiver, who operated the neighboring Elizabeth Street Gallery. A gravel path winds through the garden. Adjacent to the path is a balustrade salvaged from Lynnewood Hall, a mansion in Elkins Park, Pennsylvania. There are wrought-iron chairs and tables, birdbaths, and a set of columns. The space also has over 1,200 plants, in addition to a copper gazebo designed by Frederick Law Olmsted.

== Early history ==
The site was previously occupied by P.S. 106, later renamed P.S. 21; the public school was designed by master school architect C.B.J. Snyder with twelve classrooms and outdoor space. The school was completed in 1904, and it expanded in 1927, filling a 3-acre (1.2 ha) site known as Lot 41. The building was demolished in the 1970s. In 1981, the Little Italy Restoration Apartments were built on Spring Street, including much of the former school site, with the remaining space maintained as a recreational area. Plans to build a new school never materialized due to community opposition, and the P.S. 21 playground site remained vacant.

In 1990, the Manhattan Community Board 2 Parks Committee passed a resolution in favor of leasing it to owner of the Elizabeth Street Gallery, Allan Reiver. At the time, the gallery was located in a renovated 19th-century firehouse adjacent to the garden property on Elizabeth Street. Reiver leased it on a month-to-month basis and began developing the garden in 1991. The initial garden included perennials, native plants, and trees and adding architectural elements like gates, fencing, statuary, tables, and seating from Reiver's gallery collection. The gazebo and columns were among the first things that Reiver had acquired for the garden. Reiver, who did not have landscape design experience, said: "When I got things, I would just pick a spot and put it there." In 2005, Reiver installed a sign saying it was open to the public with entry through his gallery next door.

== Proposal to replace the garden ==
=== Initial proposal ===
In 2012, ownership of the land was transferred from the Board of Education to the New York City Housing Authority. The garden could be accessed only through Reiver's gallery until 2013, when Reiver agreed to add an entrance from Elizabeth Street. In 2013, community members learned that the city was planning to replace the garden with a residential building for low-income senior citizens, and organized talks and protests to save it. The community worked with Reiver to revitalize the space and leave the main gates permanently open to the public. They introduced a calendar of public programming and developed a base of support for retaining the green space for community use. This group formed the Friends of Elizabeth Street Garden, Inc., in 2014.

In 2015, the city's Department of Housing Preservation and Development (HPD) applied for a $6 million grant from the Lower Manhattan Development Corporation, to start building a housing unit on the land. Although the HPD's request was denied in March 2016, the HPD put out a request for proposals to develop the garden that year. The next year, the city selected a proposal named Haven Green, which was to contain 121 apartments for senior citizens and be seven stories high. There would also be programs for its residents, luxury ground-floor retail, 11,200 square feet of office space for co-developer Habitat NYC, and approximately 6,600 square feet of privately owned open space. Manhattan Borough President Gale Brewer and Councilmember Margaret Chin both supported the redevelopment, even as it was opposed by community members, the local community board, and state Senators and Assembly members. Chin disputed the garden's use as a longstanding public space, saying "It was never open to the public until they heard that the site was going to be designated for affordable housing."

In April 2017, members of FESG and the original community group branched off to form Elizabeth Street Garden (ESG), a community-run nonprofit. The space remained open to the public seven days a week, with free public and educational programming and music and art performances. In 2018, The Cultural Landscape Foundation registered the garden as a landscape site to help protect it from destruction.

=== Lawsuit and aftermath ===
Manhattan Community Board 2 voted in January 2019 to recommend that Haven Green not be built on the Elizabeth Street Garden site, but Brewer approved the development the next month. In March 2019, ESG filed a lawsuit to stop the proposed development, represented by Norman Siegel. The plaintiffs argued, among other things, that the city had to carry out an environmental impact statement addressing the impact to the neighborhood of losing this green space. Even so, the New York City Planning Commission voted the next month to approve Haven Green. In response, ESG's director Joseph Reiver (who was also Allan Reiver's son) requested that the New York City Conflicts of Interest Board and the Attorney General of New York investigate Haven Green's developers. In June 2019, the City Council voted unanimously to proceed with the Haven Green development.

During the COVID-19 pandemic in New York City, Joseph Reiver invited local schools to host classes at the Elizabeth Street Garden. A final decision on the site was also delayed due to the pandemic. In November 2022, the New York Supreme Court ruled that the city had to conduct an environmental impact statement before proceeding with construction. In June 2023, the Appellate Division, First Department, unanimously reversed and found that the city government's environmental assessment was satisfactory. The Appellate Division also allowed the ESG to appeal to the New York Court of Appeals, the state's highest court. The Court of Appeals ruled in favor of the city government in June 2024. In response, students from the nearby PS 130 wrote letters to Mayor Eric Adams, asking that the garden be preserved. Celebrities such as Robert De Niro, Martin Scorsese, and Patti Smith also participated in efforts to preserve the garden.

Despite the support for the garden's preservation, the city government set a deadline of September 10, 2024, for the demolition of the garden. The city government issued a formal eviction notice to the Elizabeth Street Garden organization in early October 2024, but a state judge issued an injunction preventing the ESG from being evicted until at least the end of the month. The ESG sued the city government in federal court in February 2025, claiming that the garden was an artistic landmark. The next month, a judge denied the ESG's request for an injunction. At that point, city officials could order the garden's demolition at any time. By April 2025, the city's first deputy mayor Randy Mastro had asked city officials to pause their eviction of the ESG, while the city's deputy mayor for housing Adolfo Carrión Jr. was advocating for the Elizabeth Street Garden to be redeveloped. At the time, the city government was considering developing the senior-housing complex at an alternate site several blocks away, on Suffolk Street.

=== Development cancelation and continuing litigation ===
In June 2025, the city government announced that it would cancel its plans for the development on the Elizabeth Street Garden site. The commentator Justin Davidson wrote for Curbed that the dispute "shows the weakness at the heart of our city-planning process". The developers objected, saying the decision would create a "dangerous precedent" and would cause affordable-housing developers in the city to reconsider their plans. Randy Mastro called the deal a win-win. Zohran Mamdani, the Democratic Party candidate in the 2025 New York City mayoral election, said at a meeting in late 2025 that he would evict the Elizabeth Street Garden and build housing on the site, a comment that prompted opposition online.

After Mamdani's victory in November 2025, the Adams administration designated the garden as a city park, making it impossible to build on the site without state approval; Mamdani criticized the move. In the meantime, three alternate affordable-housing sites were being proposed. On November 19, 2025, the developers of Haven Green filed a lawsuit challenging the city's designation of the Elizabeth Street Garden site as parkland. The lawsuit was paused the next week while the developers negotiated for an alternate site, and supporters of the garden wrote to Mamdani, asking him to preserve the garden. Mastro offered Haven Green's developers another city-owned site if the developers withdrew their lawsuit before December 31, Adams's last day in office. In August 2026, Mamdani abandoned his plans to redevelop the Elizabeth Street Garden site.

== Gallery ==
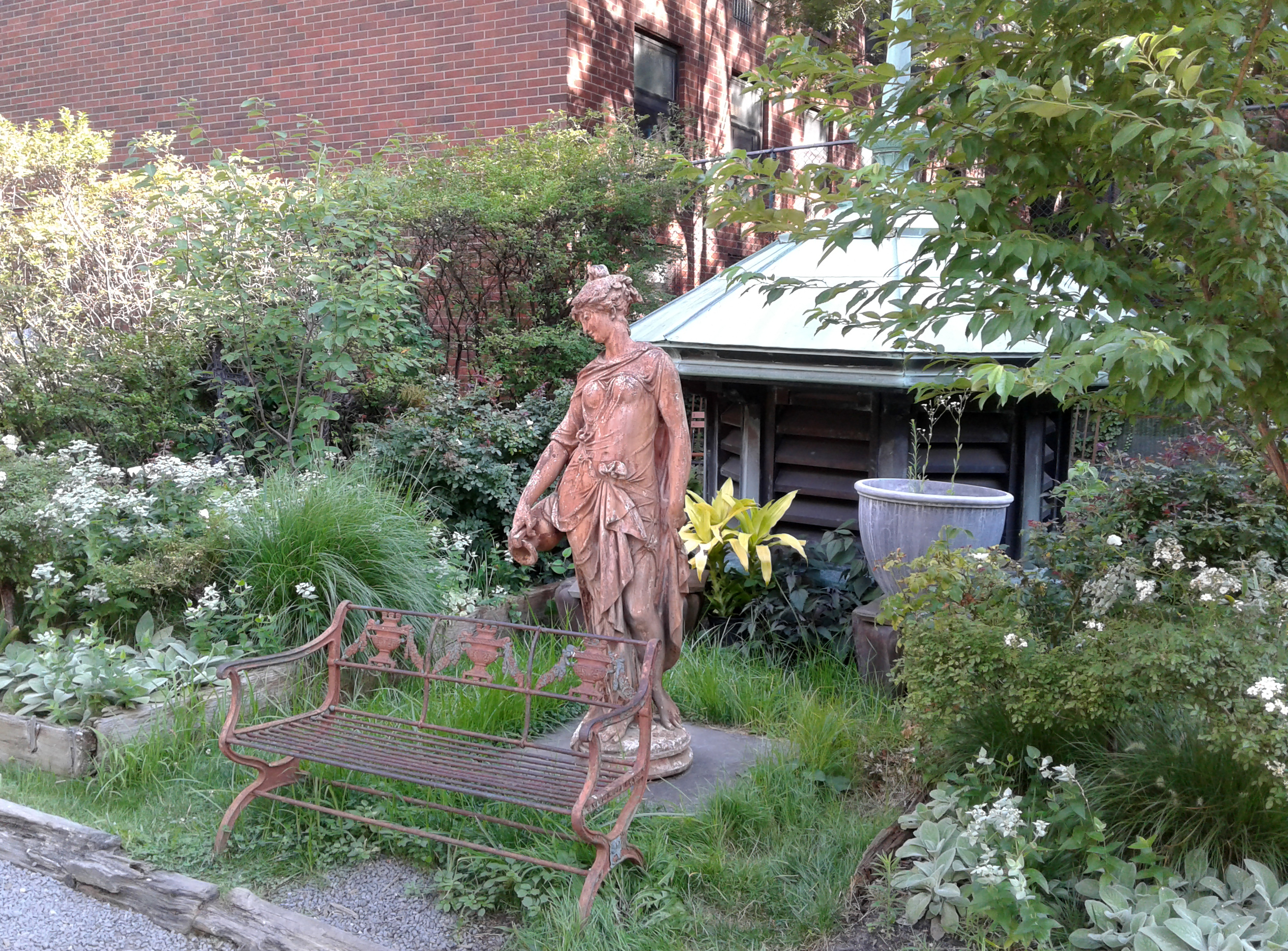

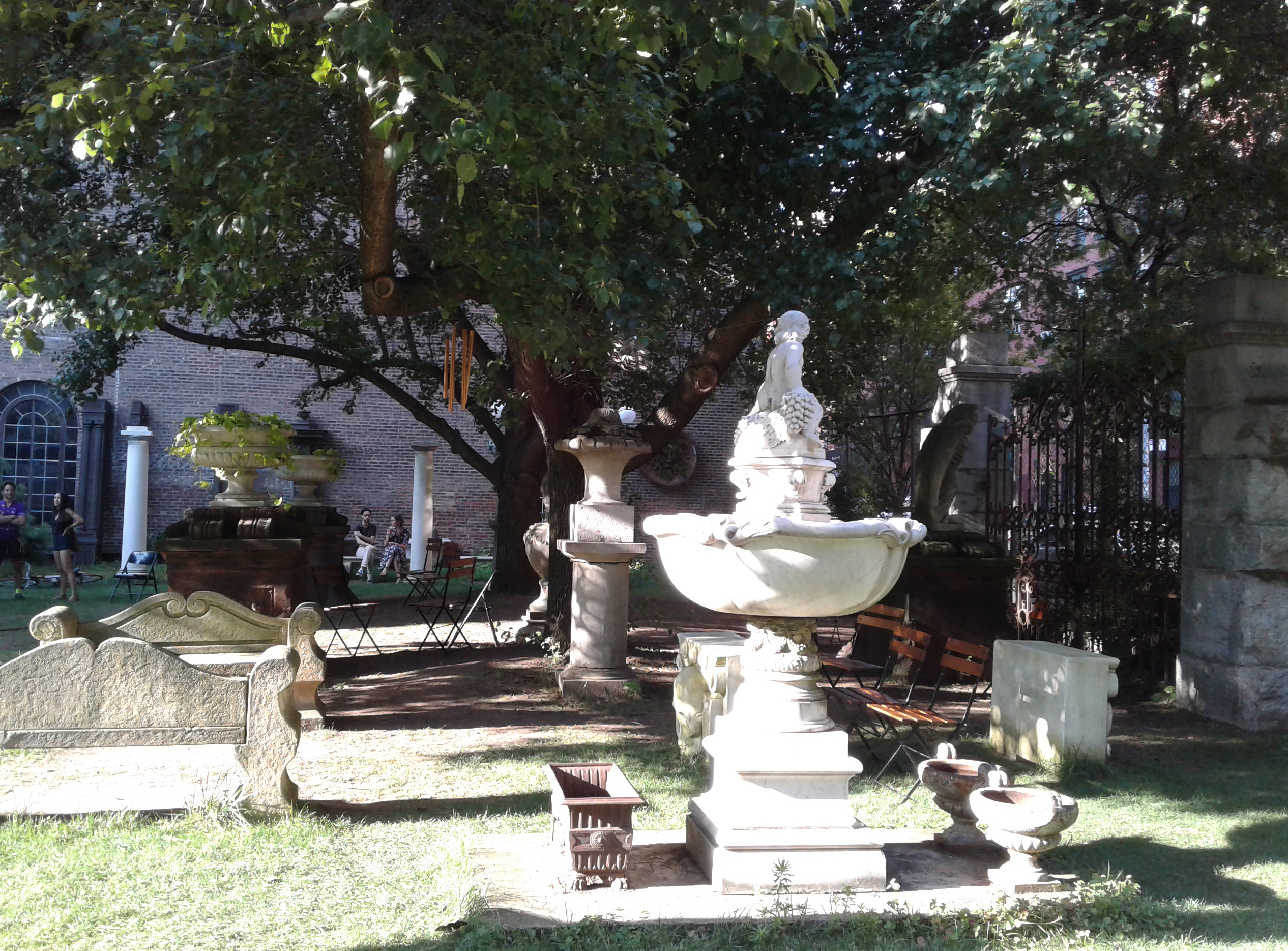

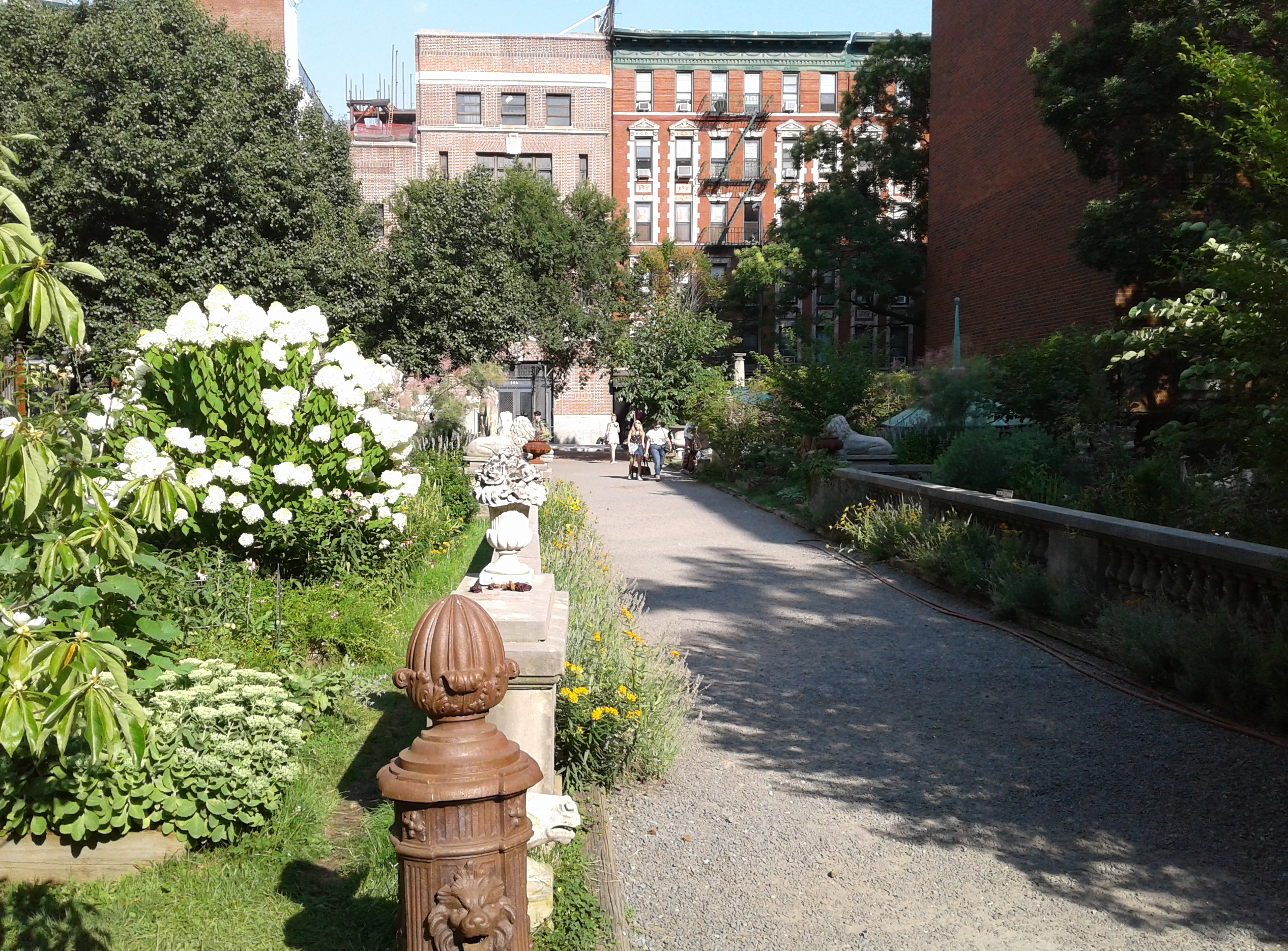

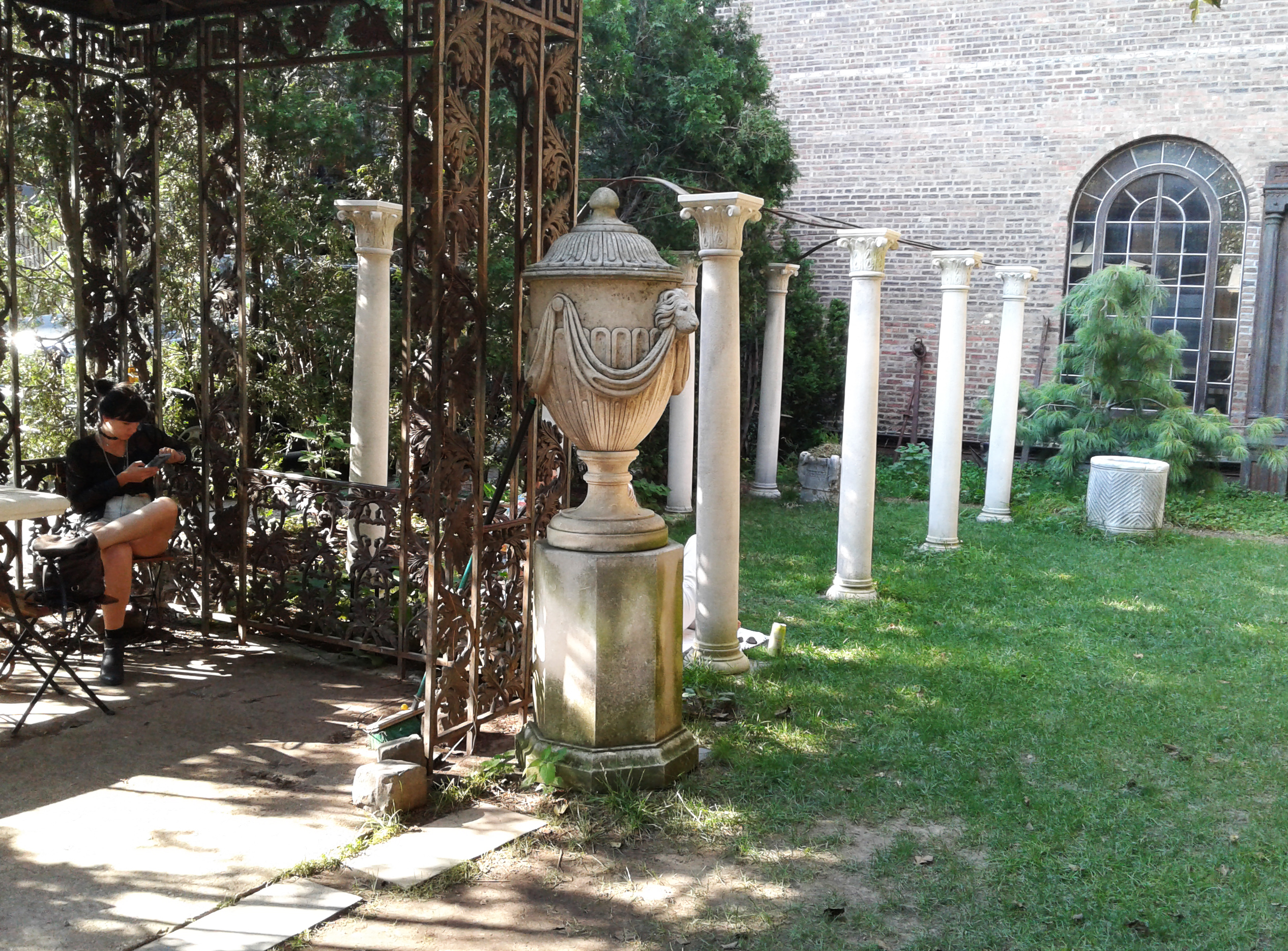

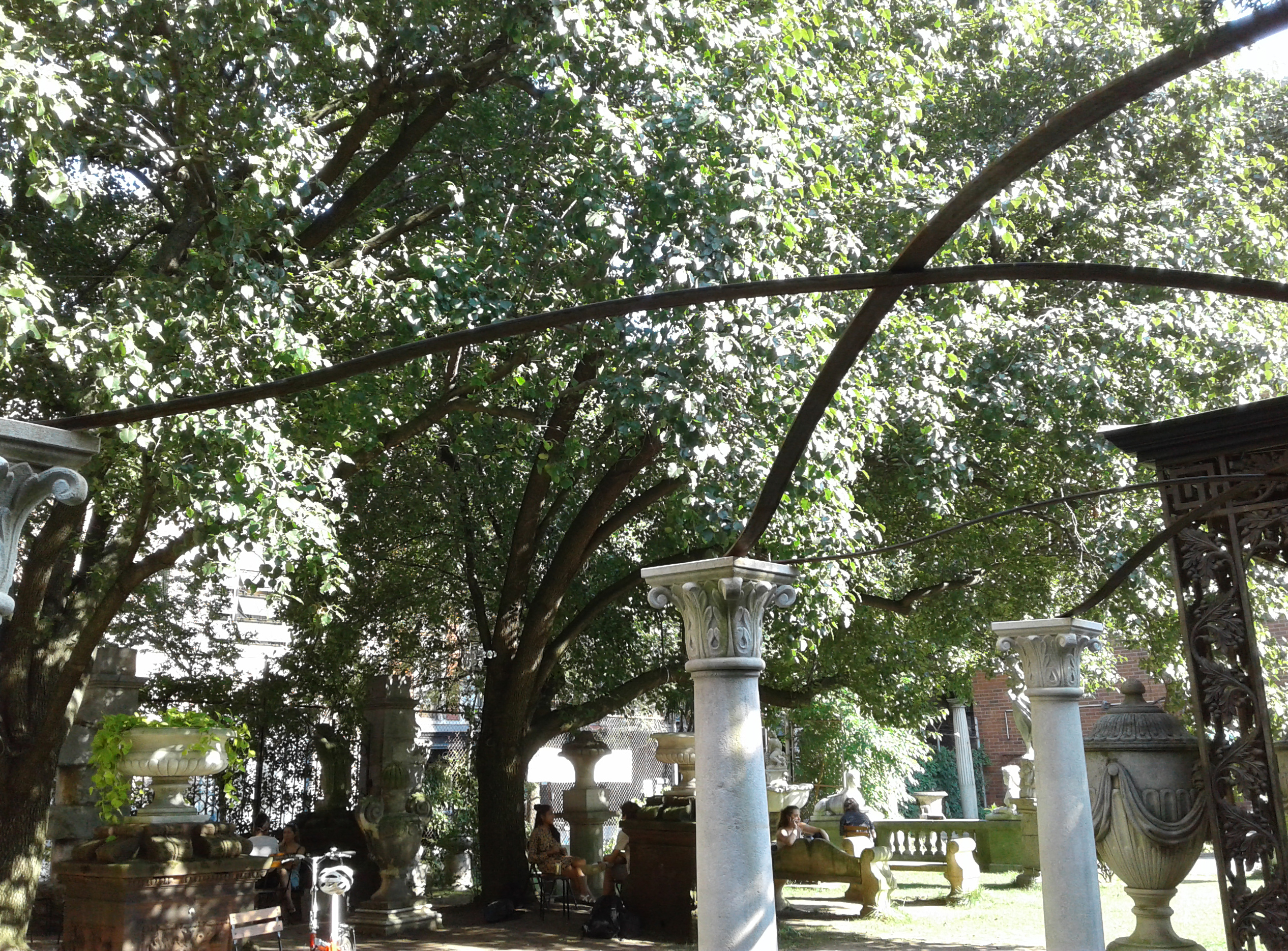

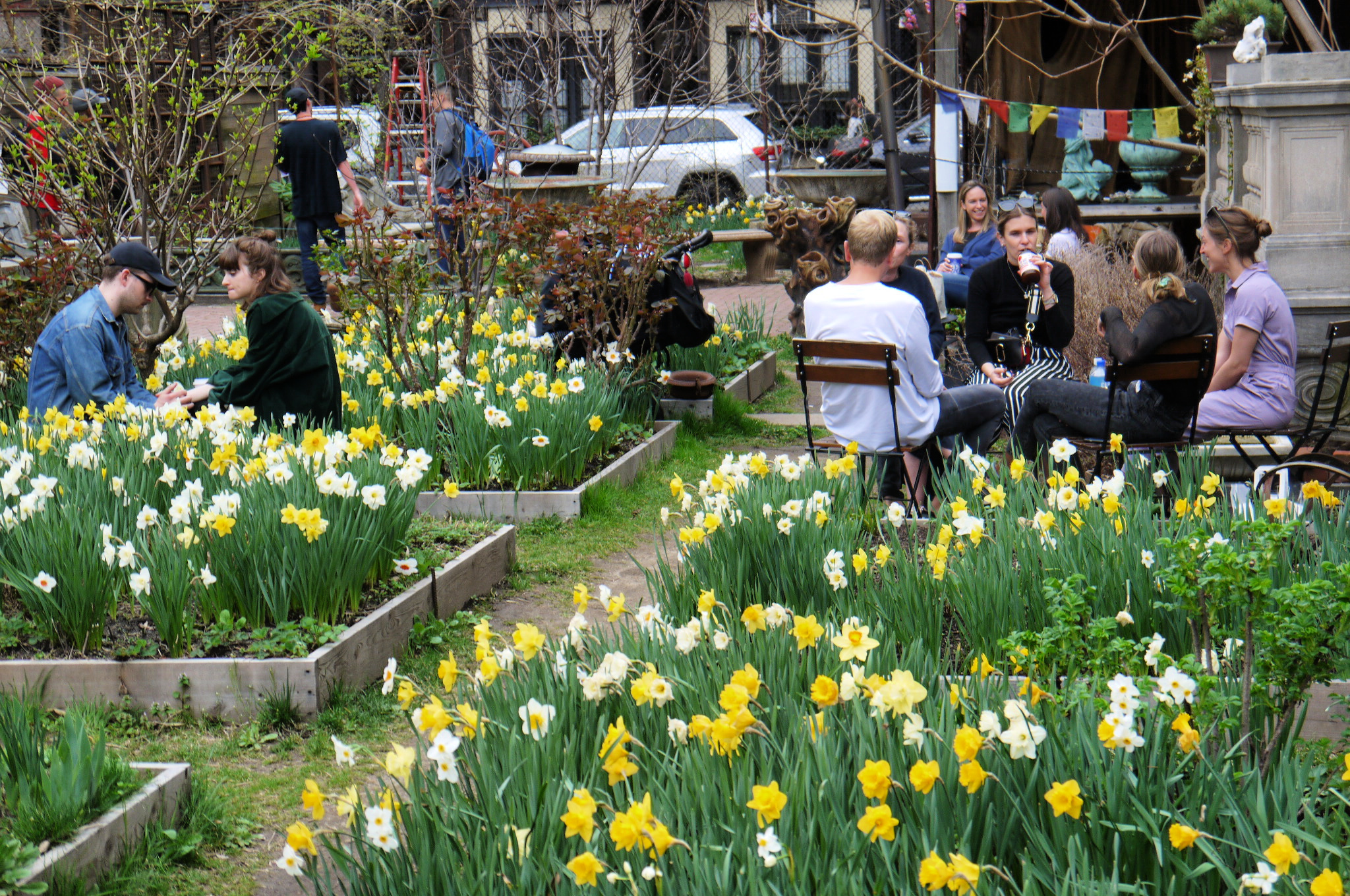

== See also ==
- Community gardens in New York City
- Community gardening in the United States
