= St. Patrick's Old Cathedral School =

Defunct school in Manhattan, New York

Coordinates: 40.7228°N 73.9951°W

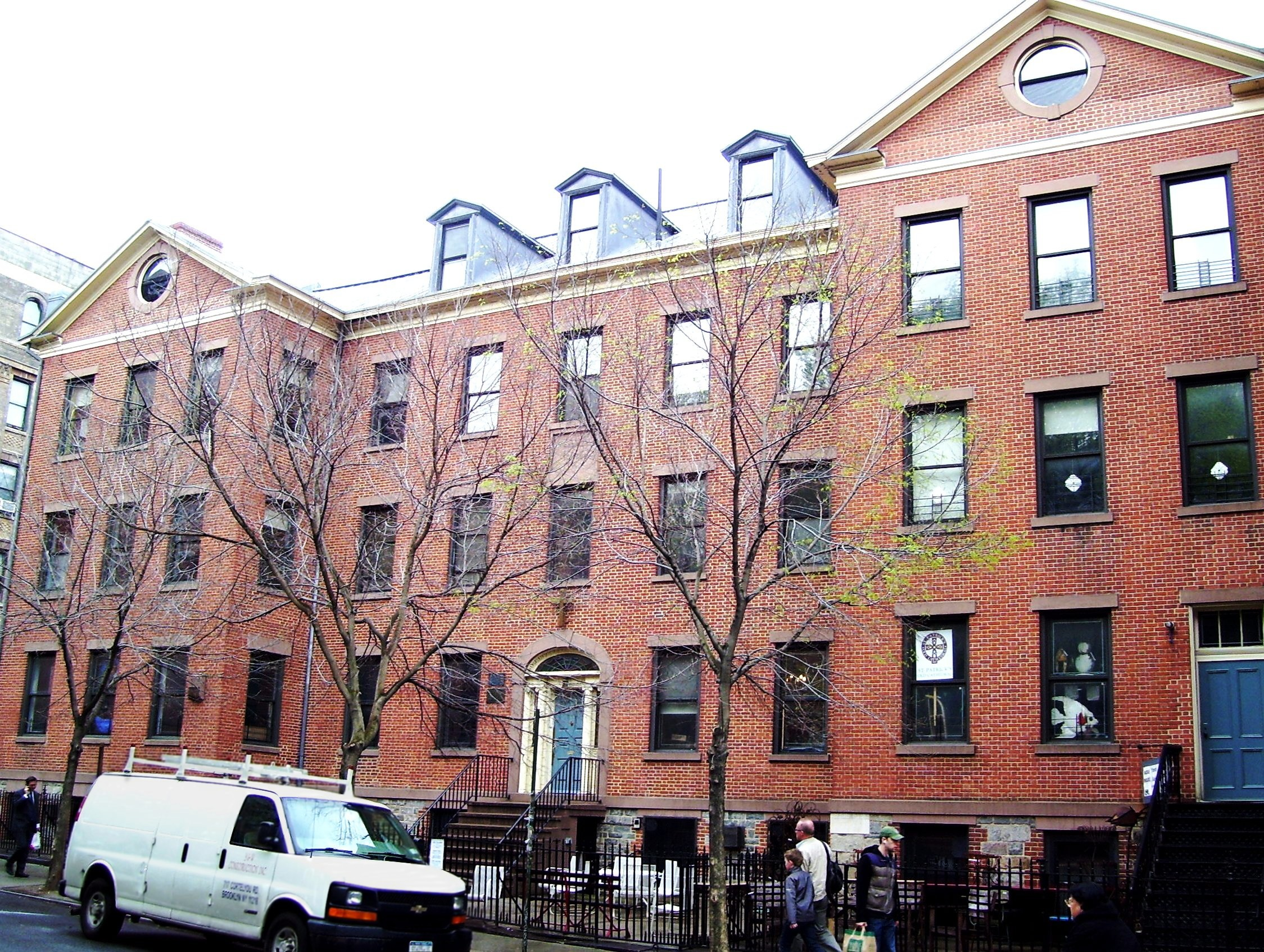

Location
- 32 Prince Street; Manhattan, New York City; United States

Information
- Religious affiliation: Catholicism
- Established: 1886
- Closed: 2010
- Grades: Pre-Kindergarten - Grade 8
- Enrollment: 129 (2010)

St. Patrick's Old Cathedral School, at 32 Prince Street between Mulberry and Mott Streets in the Nolita neighborhood of Manhattan, New York City, was a Roman Catholic Pre-K through 8th grade school. It was one of the oldest schools in the Archdiocese of New York and in the city. It was founded by the Sisters of Charity and had a peak enrollment of approximately 500 students, Catholics and non-Catholics alike.

The Federal-style building has been a New York City landmark since 1966 and, as part of the St. Patrick's Old Cathedral complex, was added to the National Register of Historic Places in 1977. It has been described as "the most significant institutional building in the Federal style surviving in New York City."

The school closed in June 2010 due to low enrollment, and is slated to be turned into luxury townhouses, condominiums, and office space.

== History ==
The brick building which the school occupied was built in 1825–1826 for the Roman Catholic Orphan Asylum, which had been founded in 1822 in a wooden building on the same site by three Sisters of Charity sent by St. Elizabeth Ann Seton. In 1851, the asylum became for girls only, and in 1886 was turned into St. Patrick's Convent and Girls' School, New York's first and oldest parochial school.

Beginning with the city's Irish, French, and German Catholic communities, the school served successive generations of immigrant children. Film director Martin Scorsese was a notable alumnus from the school's Little Italy generations, during the early and middle 1900s. Even in the 21st century, the school's population included a diverse mix of immigrants from many races and ethnic communities; school notices were routinely printed in English, Spanish, and Chinese. Over 90% of students came from families below the national poverty level.

== Closure ==
The Archdiocese of New York closed Saint Patrick's Old Cathedral School in June 2010, due to low enrollment. Parents of the final 129 students in Pre-K through eighth grade were given the opportunity to enroll them in the nearby Immaculate Conception School, St. Brigid School, or Our Lady of Sorrows School.
