= Elizabeth Street (Manhattan) =

Street in Manhattan, New York City

Coordinates: 40.720°N 73.995°W

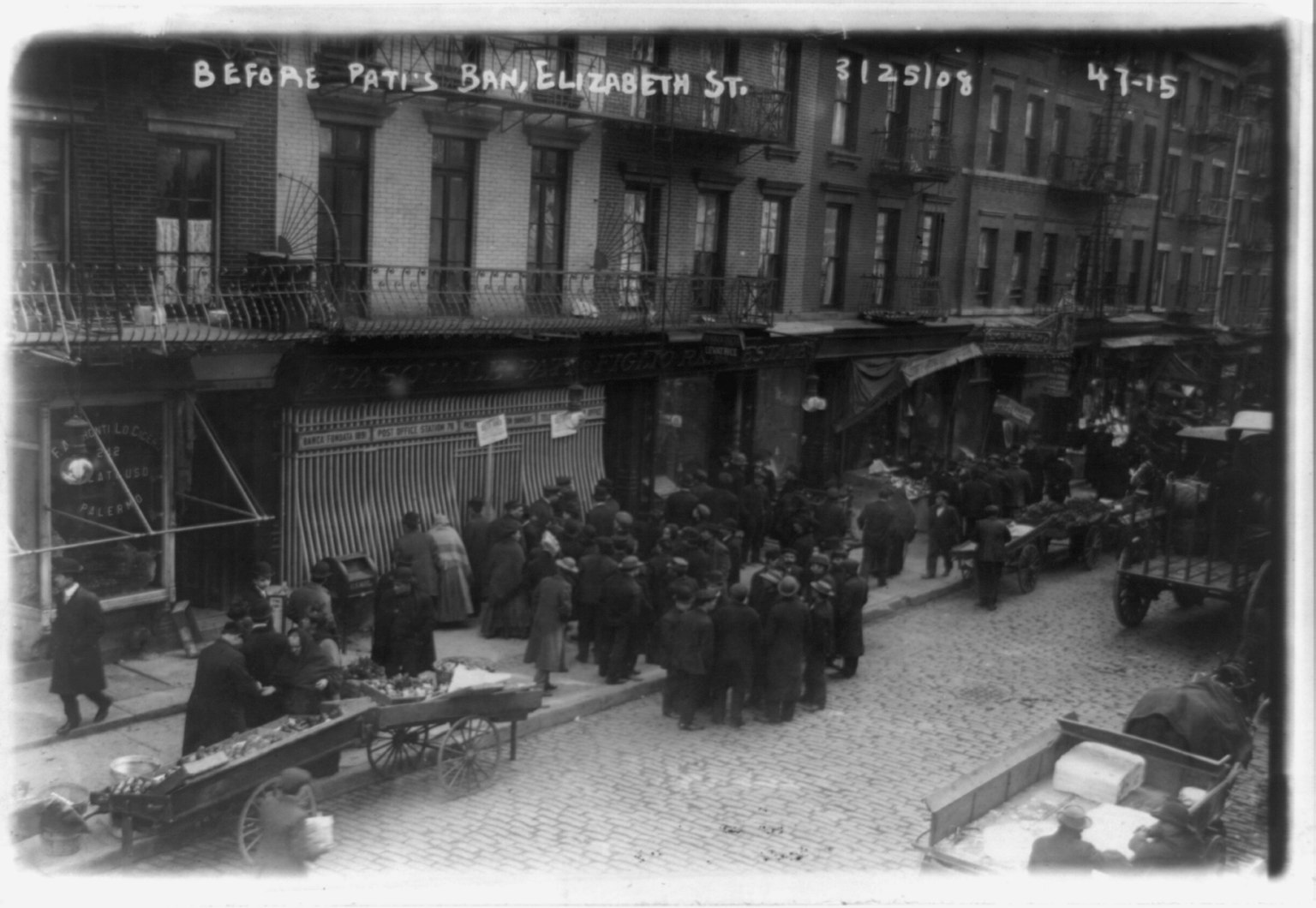
Elizabeth Street in 1908

Elizabeth Street (Chinese: 伊利莎白街) is a street in Manhattan, New York City, which runs north-south parallel to and west of the Bowery. The street is a popular shopping strip in Lower Manhattan's Nolita neighborhood.

The southern part of Elizabeth Street was constructed in 1755. It was extended north to Bleecker Street in 1816.

In the late 19th and early 20th centuries, Elizabeth Street was filled with tenement buildings, largely populated by Sicilian immigrants, making the street part of the onetime Little Italy of Lower Manhattan. By the late 20th century, many Chinese immigrants moved to Elizabeth Street, south of Kenmare Street, forming Manhattan's Chinatown. The northern portion runs through the modern neighborhoods of Soho and Nolita.

== Little Sicily ==
During the height of Italian immigration to the United States of America between the 1880s and 1940s, many Sicilian immigrants settled together on Elizabeth Street. Many of these immigrants came from fishing towns such as Castellammare del Golfo, Sciacca, Palermo, Messina and Catania. At one time, Elizabeth Street was home to the largest congregation of Sicilian speakers outside of Sicily. In the 1950s after World War II, many of these Sicilian immigrants moved out of Elizabeth Street and to other parts of New York City such as Bensonhurst, Brooklyn, Staten Island and other parts of the tri-state area such as Westchester, Long Island and New Jersey.

== Notable buildings ==
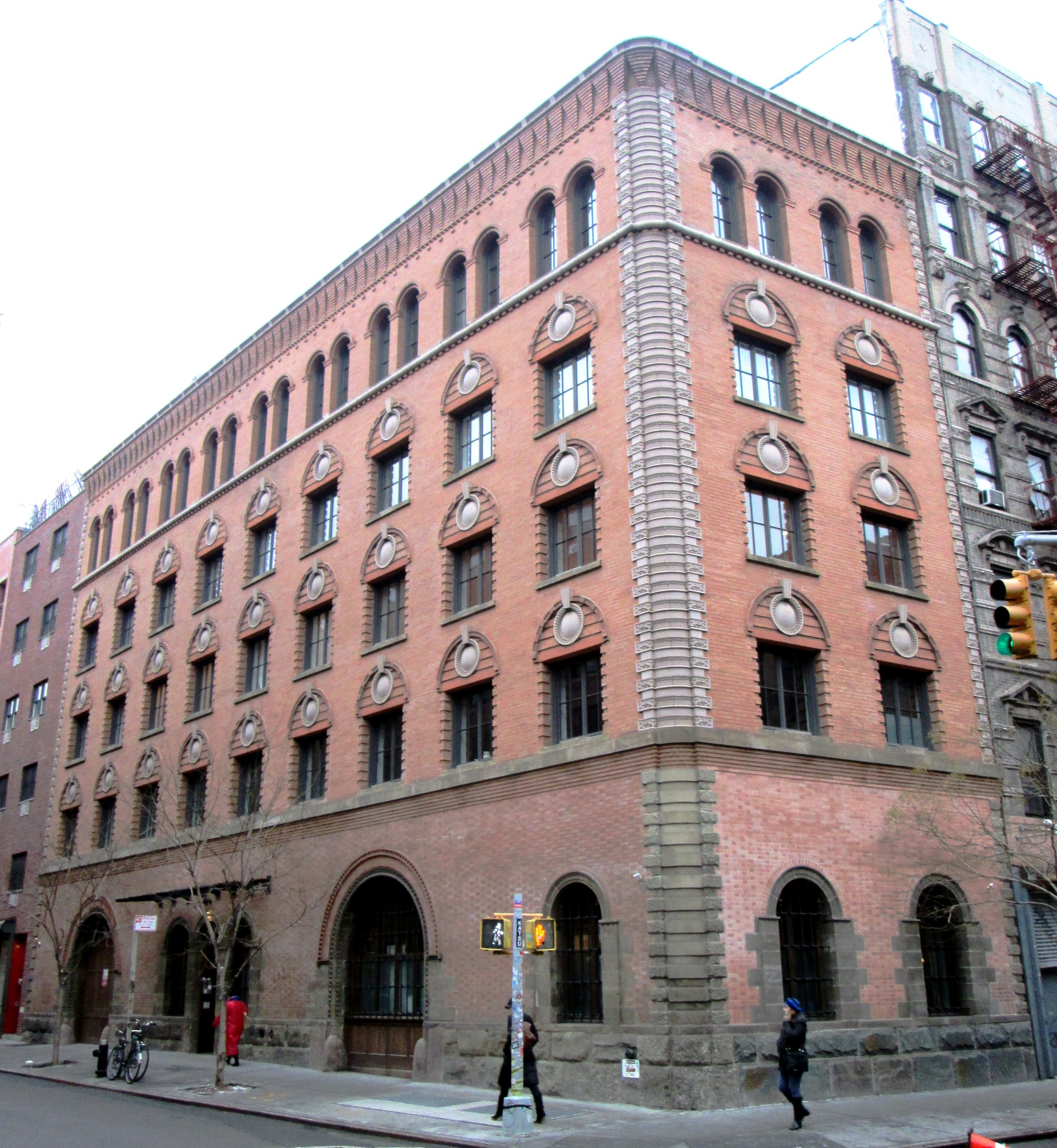
The Candle Building on the corner of Elizabeth and Spring Streets

Elizabeth Street has several buildings of note, including the New York Chinese School which caters to both Cantonese and Mandarin speakers; the Trust in God Baptist Church; and the New York City Police Department 5th Precinct. At Grand Street, the rear of the Bowery Savings Bank Building faces Elizabeth Street.

11 Spring Street, a former stable and carriage house at the corner of Elizabeth Street, was built in 1888. It was once a noted magnet for graffiti artists, who covered the exterior of the building with their artwork. When the building was bought for conversion into condominiums, the developers, in collaboration with the Wooster Collective, mounted a show inside the building, inviting well-known graffitists – many of whom had work on the outside – to cover the entire five floors of the building's interior. The show opened in December 2006 for a few days, before work on the conversion began and the artwork was covered over or destroyed. Prior to its days as a canvas for graffiti, the stable had been the home of IBM employee John Simpson for 30 years. Simpson had filled it with Rube Goldberg-like mechanisms, and put burnt candles, surplus from the 1964 New York World's Fair, in the windows, giving the building its nickname at the time, the "Candle Building".

== Chinatown businesses ==
Near the New York City Police Department's 5th Precinct station house, the Jing Fong restaurant at 20 Elizabeth Street was for decades the largest Chinese restaurant in Chinatown. It specialized in Cantonese dim sum dishes as well as Cantonese cuisine and Hong Kong cuisine. It was often used for banquets, cultural events, and parties, and attracted many non-Asian customers. Jing Fong moved to a much smaller location at Centre Street in 2021 as a result of the COVID-19 pandemic in New York City.

Elizabeth Street has three Cantonese food markets: Hong Kong Supermarket, at Hester and Elizabeth Streets; Deluxe Food Market, from Elizabeth to Mott Street, between Hester and Grand Streets; and Po Wing Hong Market.

Adjacent to the 5th police precinct, there is a small two-floor Hong-Kong-style shopping center Elizabeth Center.

Since 1976, Eastern Bookstore has been located at 13-17 Elizabeth Street. It is the largest Chinese Bookstore in Manhattan's Chinatown. It sells other Chinese cultural products such as gifts and accessories as well as Chinese calligraphy products.

== Private Danny Chen Way ==
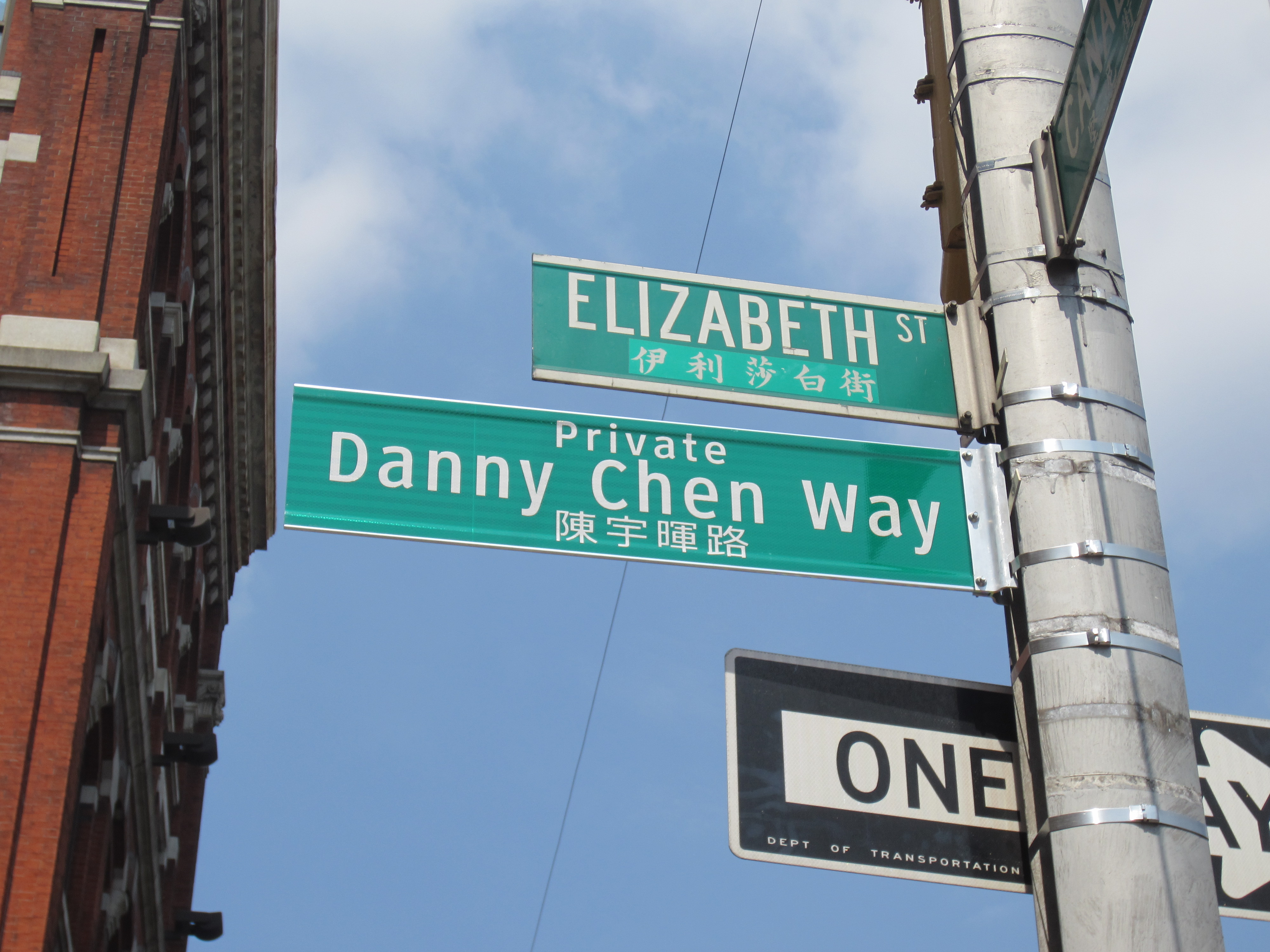
Street sign at Canal Street. Elizabeth Street south of Canal Street is co-named for Danny Chen.

In May 2014, a portion of Elizabeth Street below Canal Street was given an extra name: Private Danny Chen Way (陳宇暉路), in memory of Danny Chen, a Cantonese Chinese New Yorker born and raised in Manhattan's Chinatown. After joining the United States Army, he fatally shot himself after being bullied by other American soldiers, some of whom were charged with anti-Asian harassment that led to Chen's apparent suicide.

== See also ==
- Elizabeth Street Garden
