= Jing Fong =

- Interactive map of Jing Fong

Restaurant information
- Established: 1978; 48 years ago
- Owners: Shui Ling Lam; Chun Tsui
- Food type: Chinese cuisine Dim sum
- Location: 202 Centre Street, New York City, Manhattan, 10013, United States
- Coordinates: 40°43′08″N 73°59′57″W
- Website: jingfongny.com

Jing Fong
- Traditional Chinese: 金豐
- Simplified Chinese: 金丰
Transcriptions
Standard Mandarin
- Hanyu Pinyin: Jīnfēng
Yue: Cantonese
- Yale Romanization: gām fūng
- Jyutping: gam1 fung1
other Yue
- Taishanese: gim1 fuung1

Jing Fong Restaurant
- Traditional Chinese: 金豐(大)酒樓
- Simplified Chinese: 金丰(大)酒楼
- Literal meaning: Jing Fong (Big) Restaurant
Transcriptions
Standard Mandarin
- Hanyu Pinyin: Jīnfēng (dà)jiǔlóu
Yue: Cantonese
- Yale Romanization: gām fūng (daaih) jáu làuh
- Jyutping: gam1 fung1 (daai6) zau2 lau4

Jing Fong (Chinese: 金豐) is a Chinese dim sum restaurant that was originally located on the second floor of 20 Elizabeth Street in Chinatown, Manhattan, New York City. It had a large seating capacity accommodating over 800 seats with 20,000 square feet.

Jing Fong is known for hosting weddings, with a large, columnless banquet hall. The price to host a wedding at Jing Fong can be as much as $150 per person. Jing Fong usually serves dim sum from 10am to 3:30pm. After 3pm, the kitchen slows down and dim sum choices become limited. On the weekends they serve over 300 different steamed, fried, and grilled dim sum dishes.

For decades, Jing Fong was the largest Cantonese and Hong Kong style dim sum restaurant in Chinatown. Due to the COVID-19 pandemic in New York City in 2020, the restaurant suffered financial hardships. In 2021, Jing Fong relocated to a smaller location on 202 Centre Street, with 125 seats.

== History ==
Jing Fong was opened in 1978 during a New York City recession. Chinese gangs in Chinatown, Manhattan were highly dominant during the 1970s which caused financial troubles and violence to arise. Jing Fong almost fell into bankruptcy before master plumber, Shui Ling Lam gained enough shares to eventually own the business. Originally located at 24 Elizabeth Street, the restaurant could only hold 70 to 80 people. In 1993, the Lam family moved it to its location at 20 Elizabeth Street.

The restaurant was ranked top six dim sum locations in New York City by CBS New York. Jing Fong is known for its high volume of customers on Lunar New Year and is currently the largest restaurant in Chinatown. On July 26, 2017, Jing Fong opened a second location on the Upper West Side in a smaller space seating a little over 100 guests and serving made to order dim sum along with creative cocktails. It is located at 380 Amsterdam Ave, New York, NY.

In 1997, The New York Attorney General's office filed a lawsuit against Jing Fong claiming the establishment had been controlling the tips and wages of workers unethically since 1993. The Asian-American Legal Defense and Education Fund sought $500,000 in federal court on behalf of the workers for the violation of minimum wage laws.

In January 2021, it was announced that Jing Fong would be permanently closing its dining room as a result of the COVID-19 pandemic, but would continue to offer orders for takeout, delivery, and outdoor dining on its patio. It has been confirmed the restaurant will be relocating to a much smaller location at 202 Centre Street, on the border of SoHo and Chinatown, in July 2021. This location formerly was occupied by previous Cantonese Dim Sum restaurants, including The Red Egg. The site will have 125 seats. The closure of the restaurant, at the time the largest and only union-run one in Chinatown, led to protests from workers, customers and community members, which tied the closure to overall gentrification and increasing inaffordibility in the neighborhood. Their 202 Centre Street location officially opened in December 2021.

== See also ==
- List of restaurants in New York City
