= Nolita =

Neighborhood of Manhattan in New York City

Coordinates: 40°43′21″N 73°59′43″W

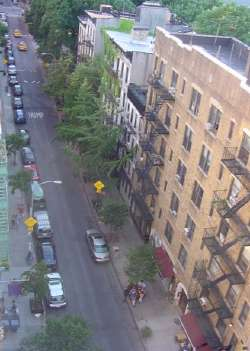
Mott Street between Houston and Prince Streets

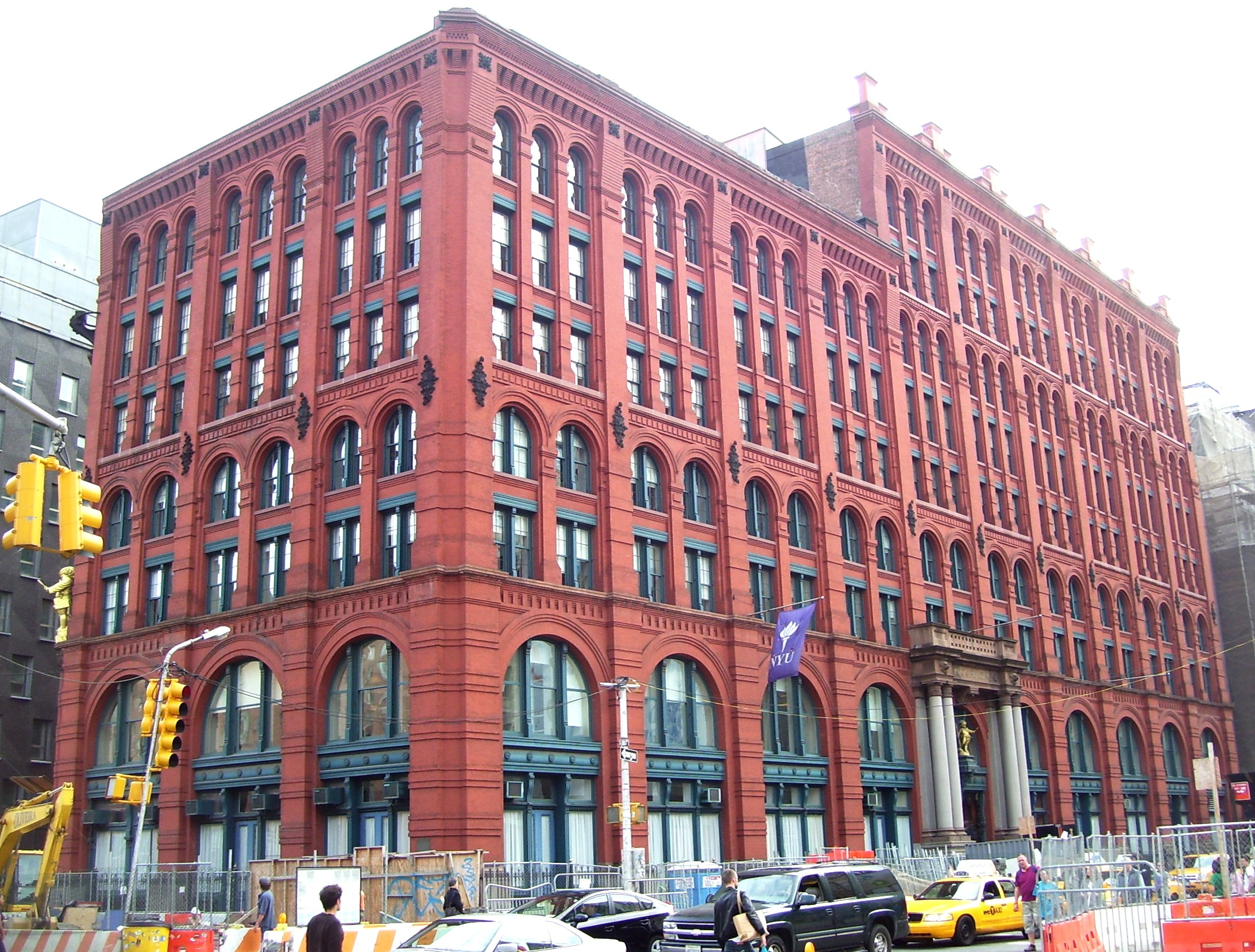
The Puck Building

Nolita, sometimes written as NoLIta and deriving from "Northern Little Italy", is a neighborhood in the borough of Manhattan in New York City. Nolita is situated in Lower Manhattan, bounded on the north by Houston Street, on the east by the Bowery, on the south roughly by Broome Street, and on the west by Lafayette Street. It lies east of SoHo, south of NoHo, west of the Lower East Side, and north of Little Italy and Chinatown.

== History and description ==
The neighborhood was long regarded as part of Little Italy, but has lost its recognizable Italian character in recent decades because of rapidly rising rents. The Feast of San Gennaro, dedicated to Saint Januarius ("Pope of Naples"), is held in the neighborhood every year following Labor Day, on Mulberry Street between Houston and Grand Streets. The feast, as recreated on Elizabeth Street between Prince and Houston Streets, was featured in the film The Godfather Part II.

In the second half of the 1990s, the neighborhood saw an influx of yuppies and an explosion of expensive retail boutiques and restaurants and bars. After unsuccessful tries to pitch it as part of SoHo, real estate promoters and others came up with several different names for consideration for this newly upscale neighborhood. The name that stuck, as documented in an article on May 5, 1996, in the New York Times city section debating various monikers for the newly trendy area, was Nolita, an abbreviation for North of Little Italy. This name follows the pattern started by SoHo (South of Houston Street) and TriBeCa (Triangle Below Canal Street).

The neighborhood includes St. Patrick's Old Cathedral, at the intersection of Mulberry, Mott, and Prince Streets, which opened in 1815 and was rebuilt in 1868 after a fire. The cornerstone was laid on June 8, 1809. This building served as New York City's Roman Catholic cathedral until the new St. Patrick's Cathedral was opened on Fifth Avenue in Midtown in 1879. St. Patrick's Old Cathedral is now a parish church. In 2010, St. Patrick's Old Cathedral was honored and became The Basilica at St. Patrick's Old Cathedral.

The Puck Building, an ornate nine-story structure built in 1885 on the corner of Houston and Lafayette Streets, originally housed the headquarters of the now-defunct Puck magazine.

Since 2010, a Little Australia has emerged in Nolita on Mulberry Street and Mott Street.

== Notable residents ==
- David Bowie and his wife, Iman, had a home here.
- Actor Gabriel Byrne lives here.
- Vanessa Carlton's song "Nolita Fairytale" was inspired by her two years in the neighborhood.
- Moby lived here.
- John Mayer owns an apartment here, featured in Elle Decor magazine.
- Martin Scorsese was raised here on Elizabeth Street between Prince and Houston, where his Italian grandparents also lived when it was Little Italy.
- Actor David Harbour has a loft here.

== Gallery ==
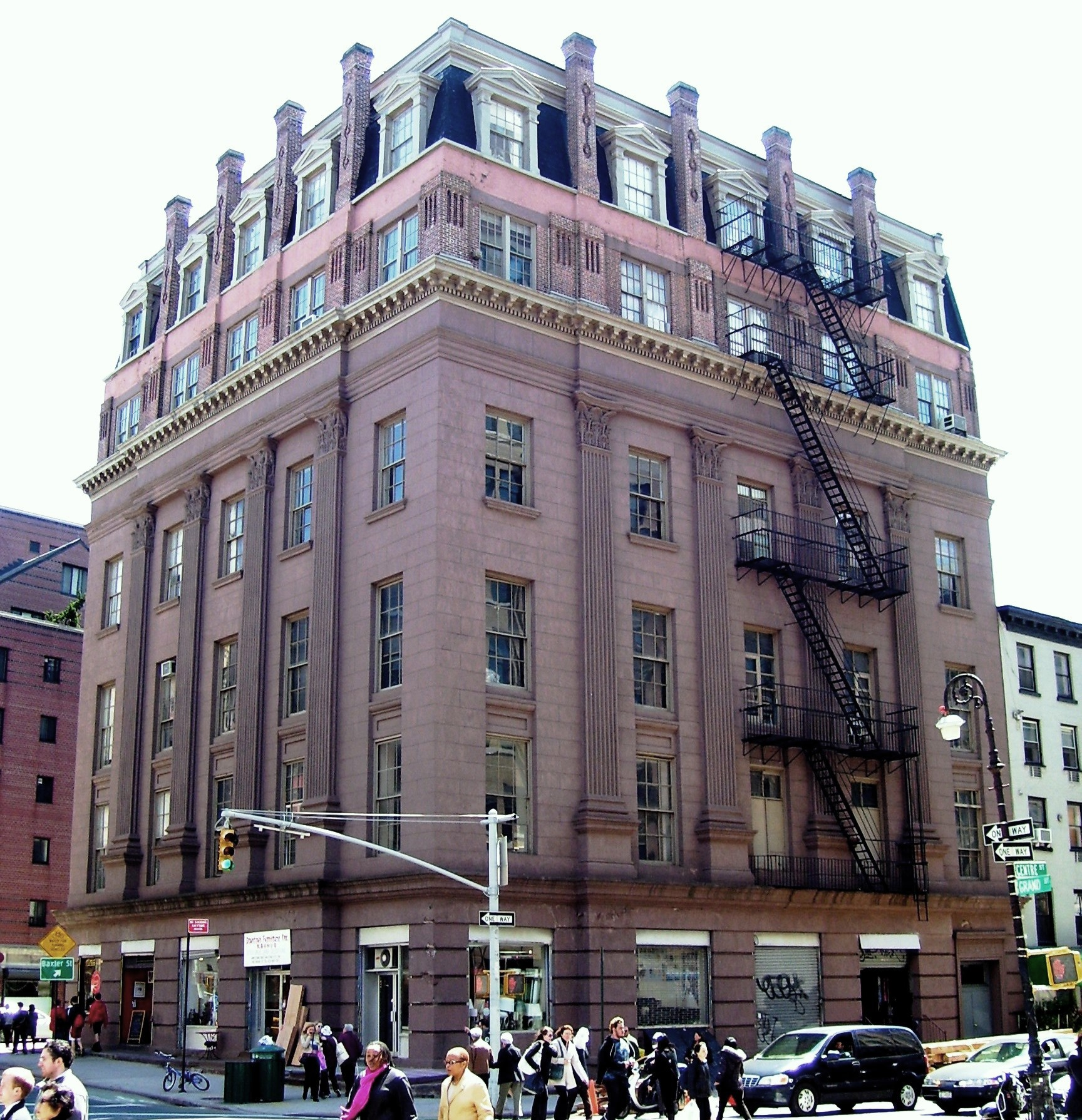
Odd Fellows Hall

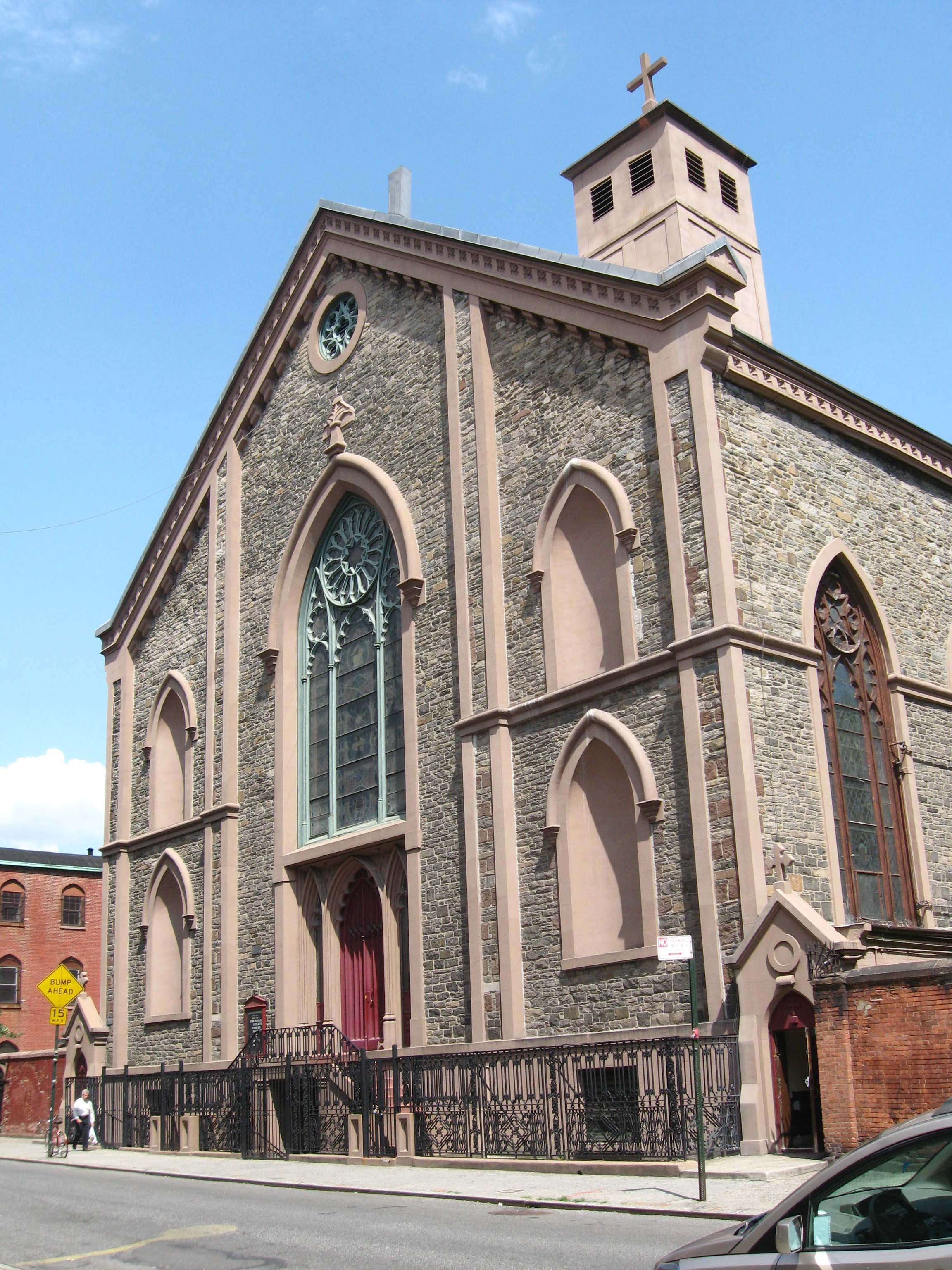
St. Patrick's Old Cathedral

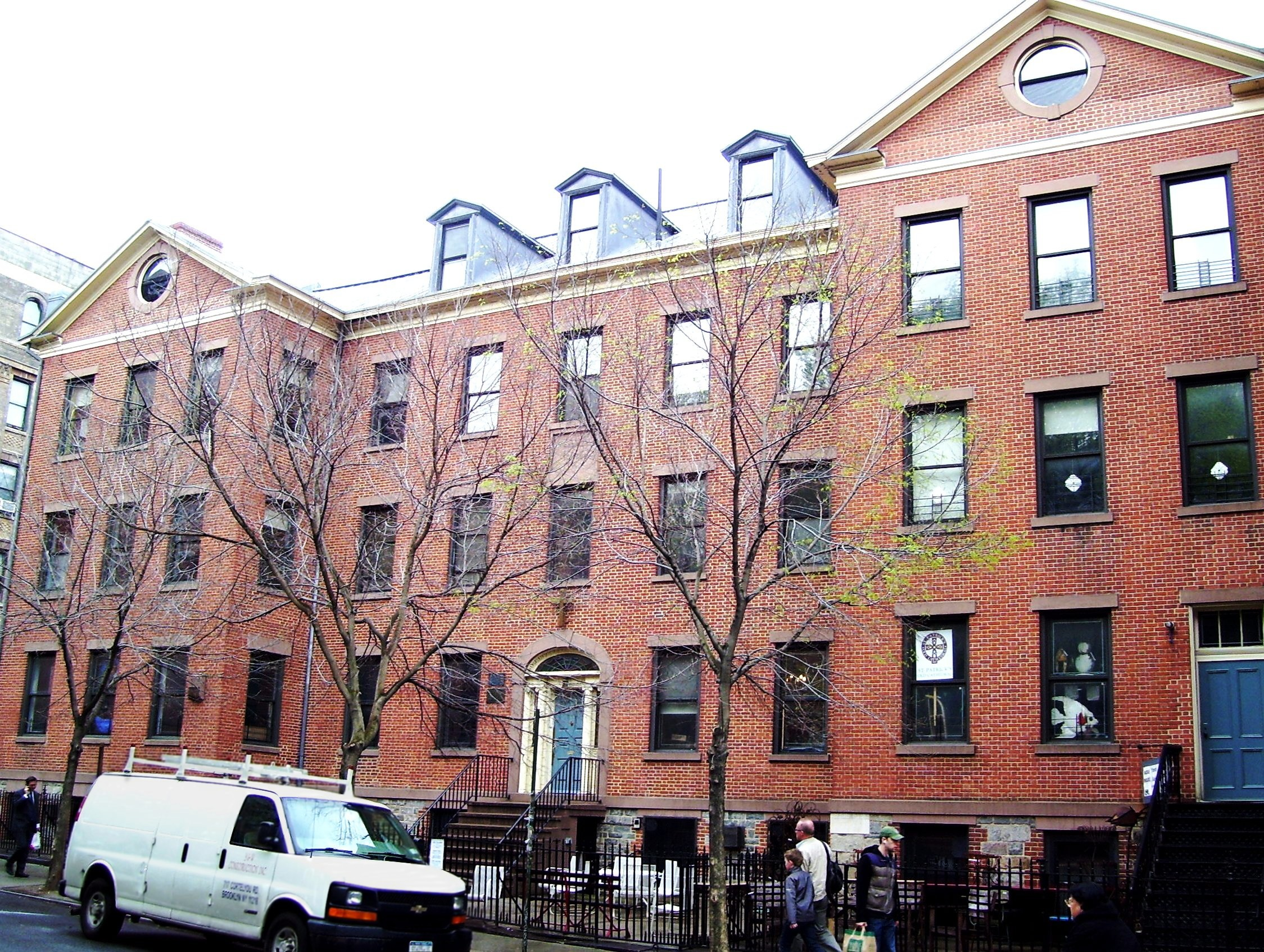
St. Patrick's Old Cathedral School

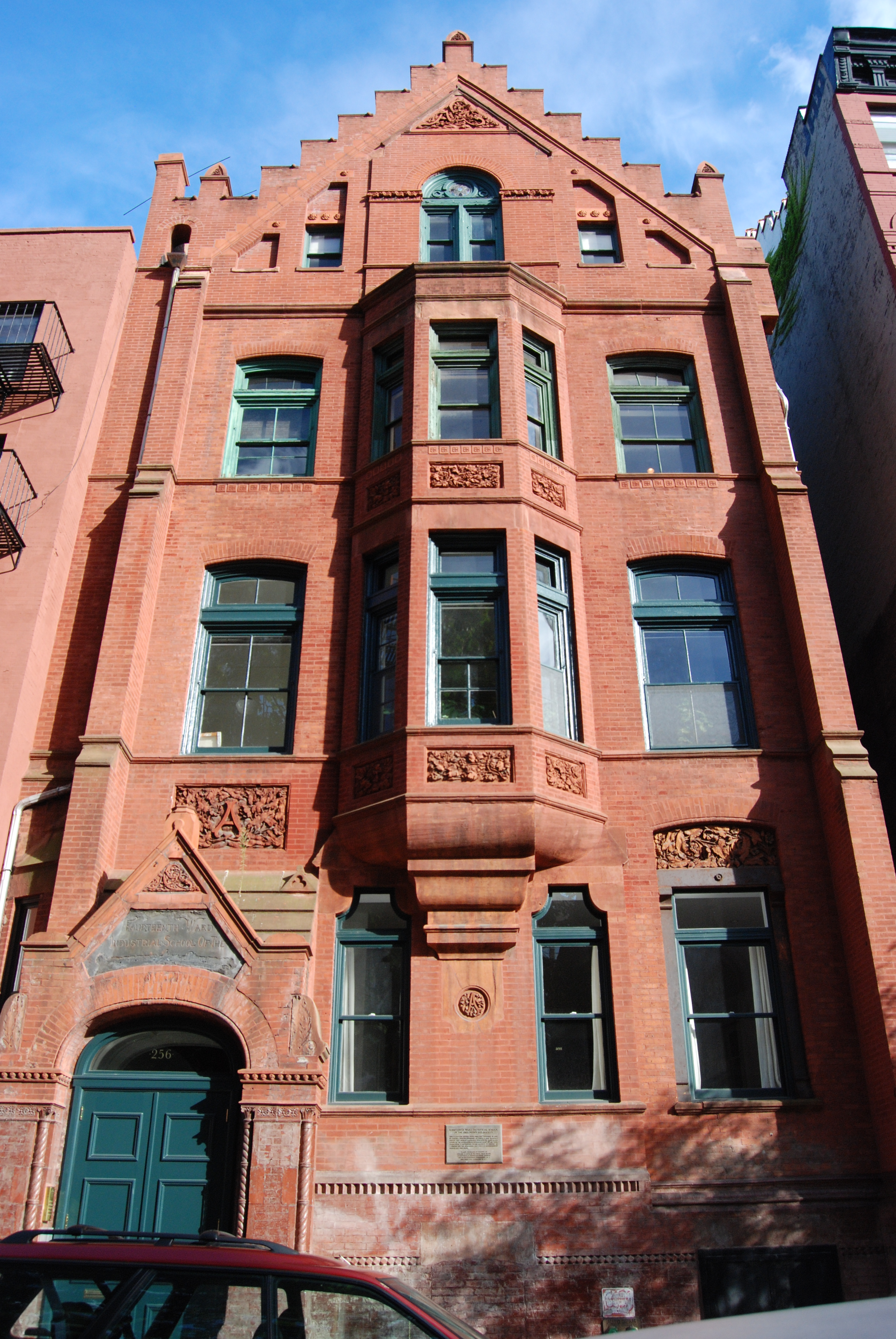
14th Ward Industrial School, designed by Calvert Vaux

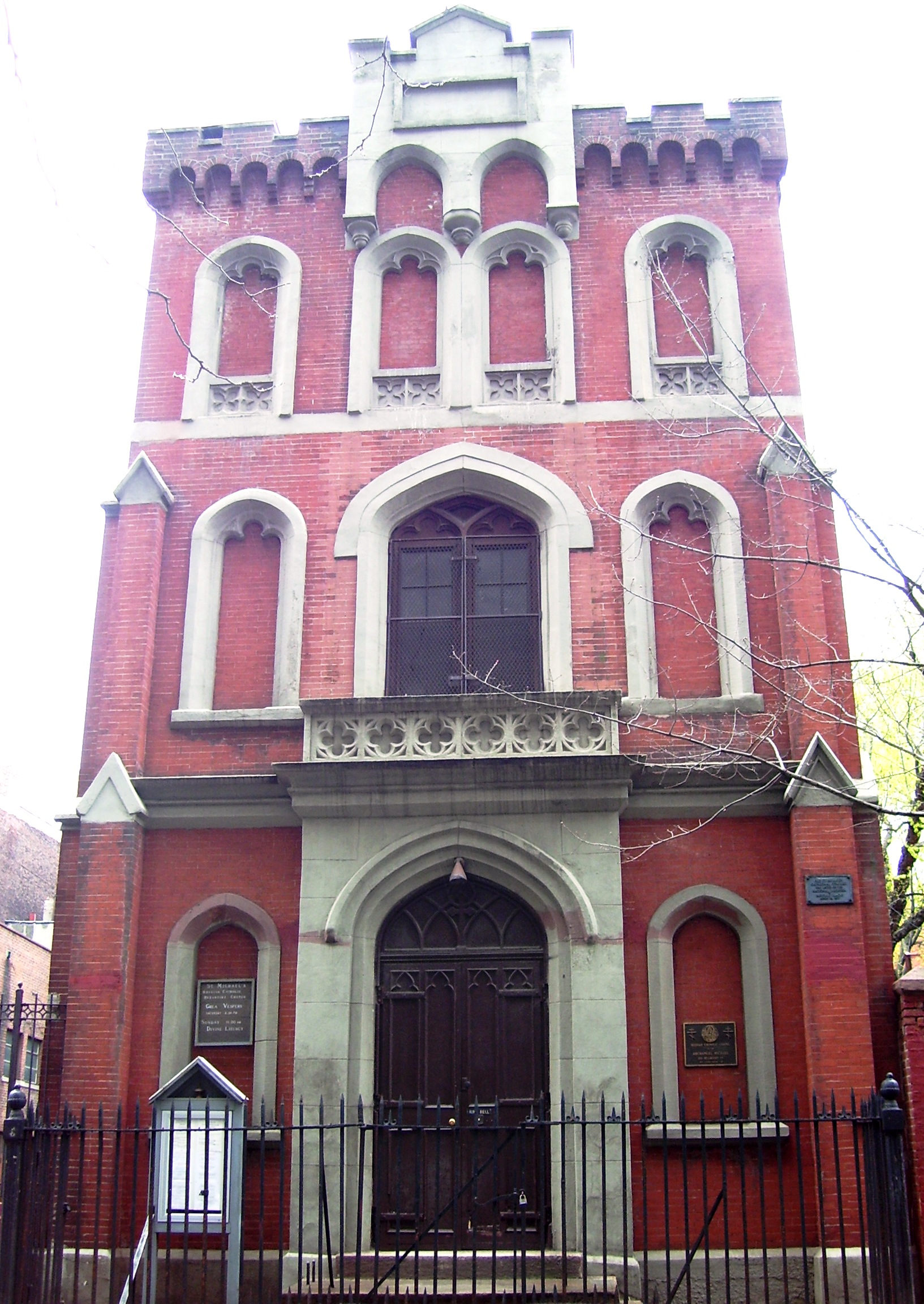
St. Michael's Russian Catholic Church

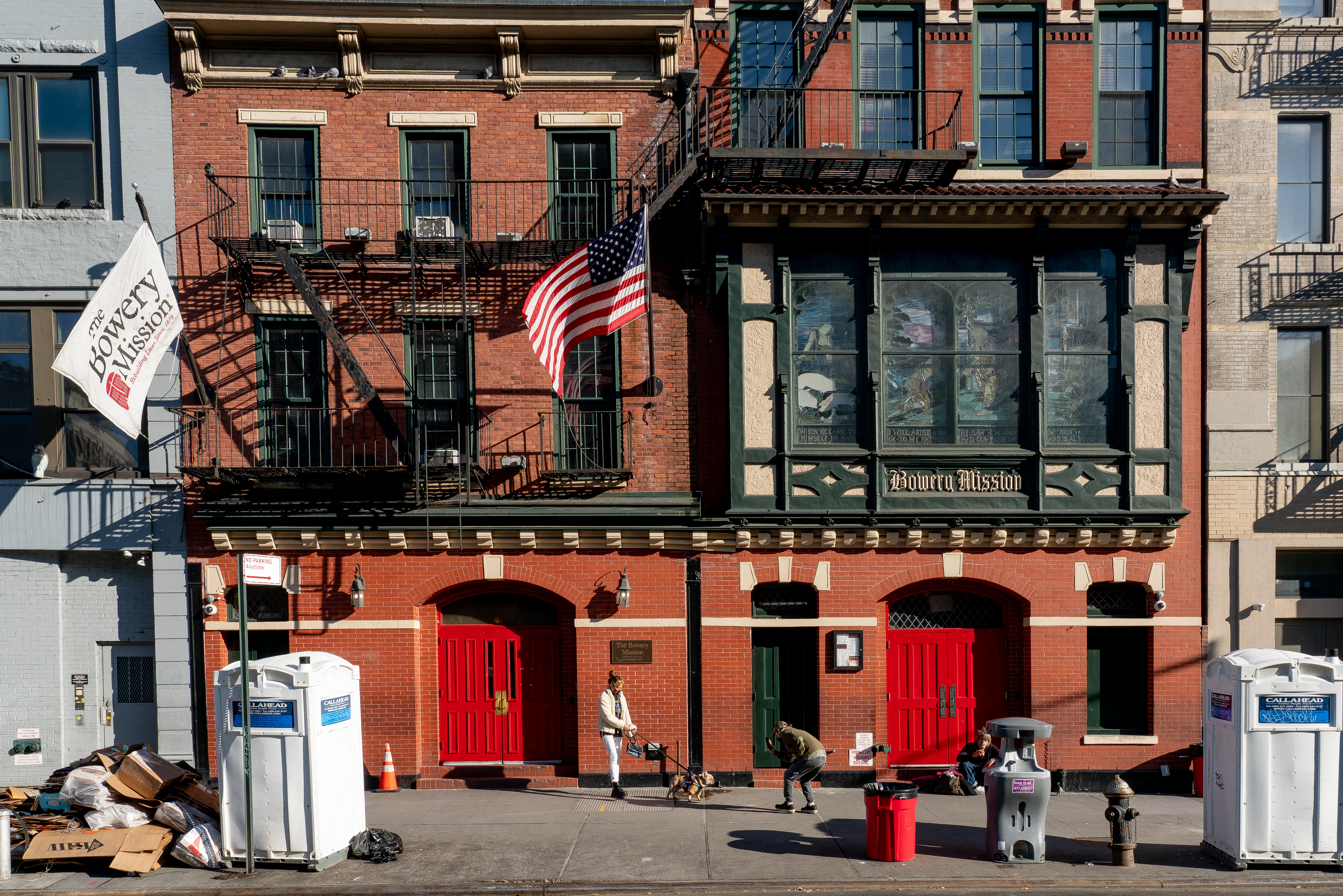
The Bowery Mission

== See also ==
- Little Australia
