= Mott Street =

Street in Manhattan, New York

Coordinates: 40.7196°N 73.9963°W

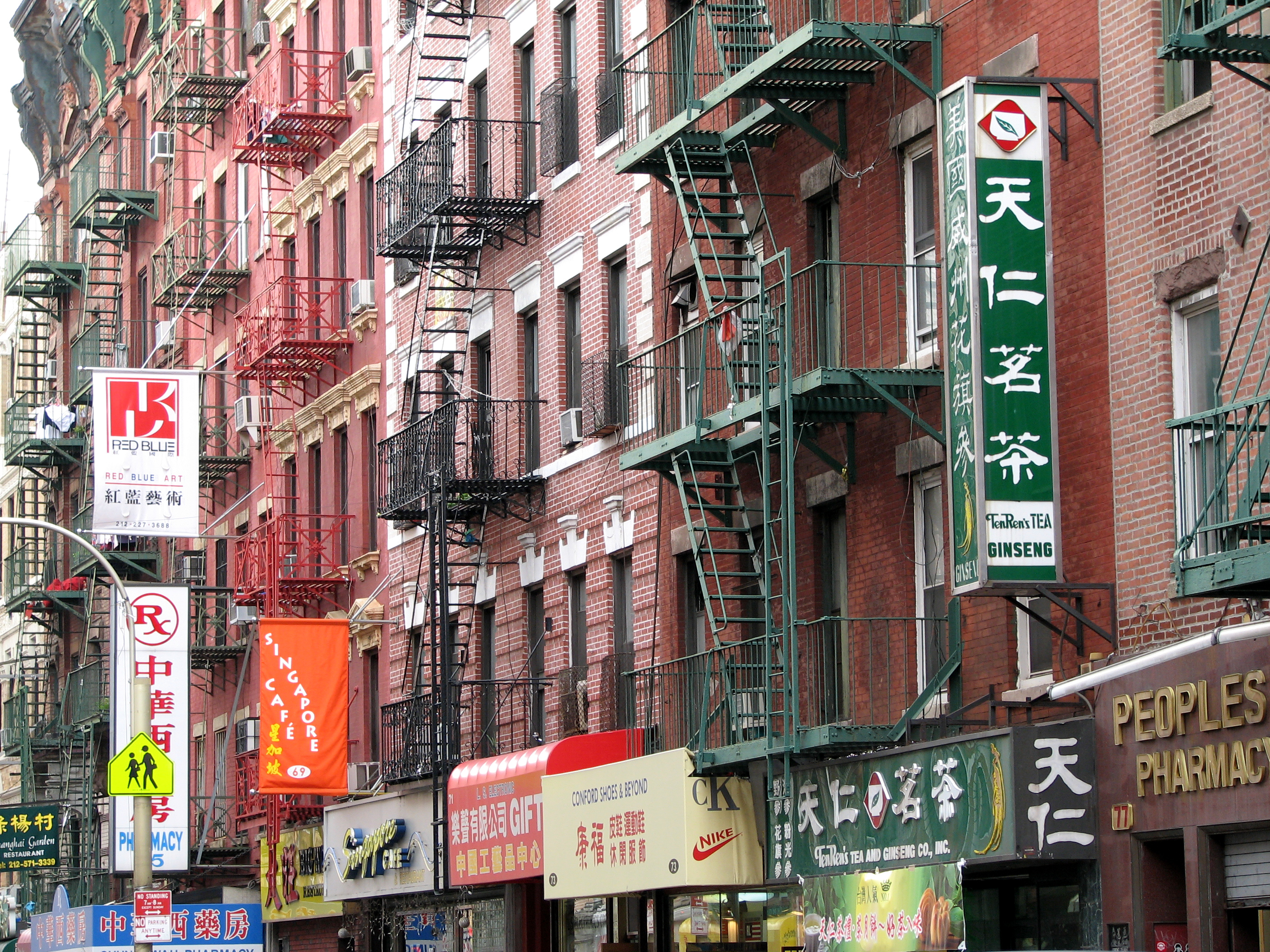
- Fire escapes on Mott Street
- Interactive map of Mott Street
- Former names: Old Street; Winne Street
- Postal code: 10012, 10013
- North end: Bleecker Street
- South end: Chatham Square

Mott Street (Chinese: 勿街; Jyutping: Mat6 gaai1) is a narrow thoroughfare that runs in a north–south direction in the New York City borough of Manhattan. It is regarded as Chinatown's unofficial "Main Street". Mott Street runs from Bleecker Street in the north to Chatham Square in the south. It is a one-way street with southbound-running vehicular traffic only.

== History ==
=== Early configuration ===
Mott Street existed in its current configuration by the mid-18th century. At that time, Mott Street passed just to the east of the Collect Pond; Collect Park today is three blocks to the west at Centre Street. Like many streets that predated Manhattan's grid, Mott Street meandered around natural features of the landscape rather than running through or over them. It was the need to avoid the now-long since paved-over Collect Pond that gave Mott Street its characteristic "bend" to the northeast at Pell Street.

Having been previously known as Old Street, as well as Winne Street (also spelled Wynne) for the section between Pell and Bleecker, Mott Street was renamed in the late 18th century to honor the prominent local family of the same name, likely in particular businessman Joseph Mott, a butcher and tavern owner who provided support to the rebel forces in the American Revolution.

During the 19th century, the lower portion of Mott Street south of Canal Street was part of the Five Points, a notorious slum in lower Manhattan. In 1872, Wo Kee, a Chinese merchant, opened a general store on Mott Street near Pell Street. In the years to follow, Chinese immigrants would carve out an enclave around the intersection of Mott, Doyer, and Pell Streets. At the time, it was mostly Guangdongese males who immigrated, and what was to become Chinatown first began as a very small Bachelor's Society. Most of these immigrants were from Taishan, in southwestern Guangdong, China, so as a result it was originally a Taishanese community. That all changed during the 1960s, when an influx of Cantonese immigrants from Hong Kong and Taiwan began arriving, as well. As a result, Chinatown began expanding quickly, and Standard Cantonese, which is spoken in Guangzhou, China and in Hong Kong, became the dominant language of the neighborhood. Chinatown had fully emerged and grown into a veritable Little Hong Kong.

Manhattan's Chinatown has since grown into the largest Chinatown in the United States, engulfing a large swathe of the Lower East Side. Nevertheless, the historic heart of Chinatown, as well as the primary destination for tourists, is still Mott Street between Canal Street and Chatham Square. This comprises the center of what is known as the Old Chinatown of Manhattan.

=== The Beginning of the Chinese Community ===
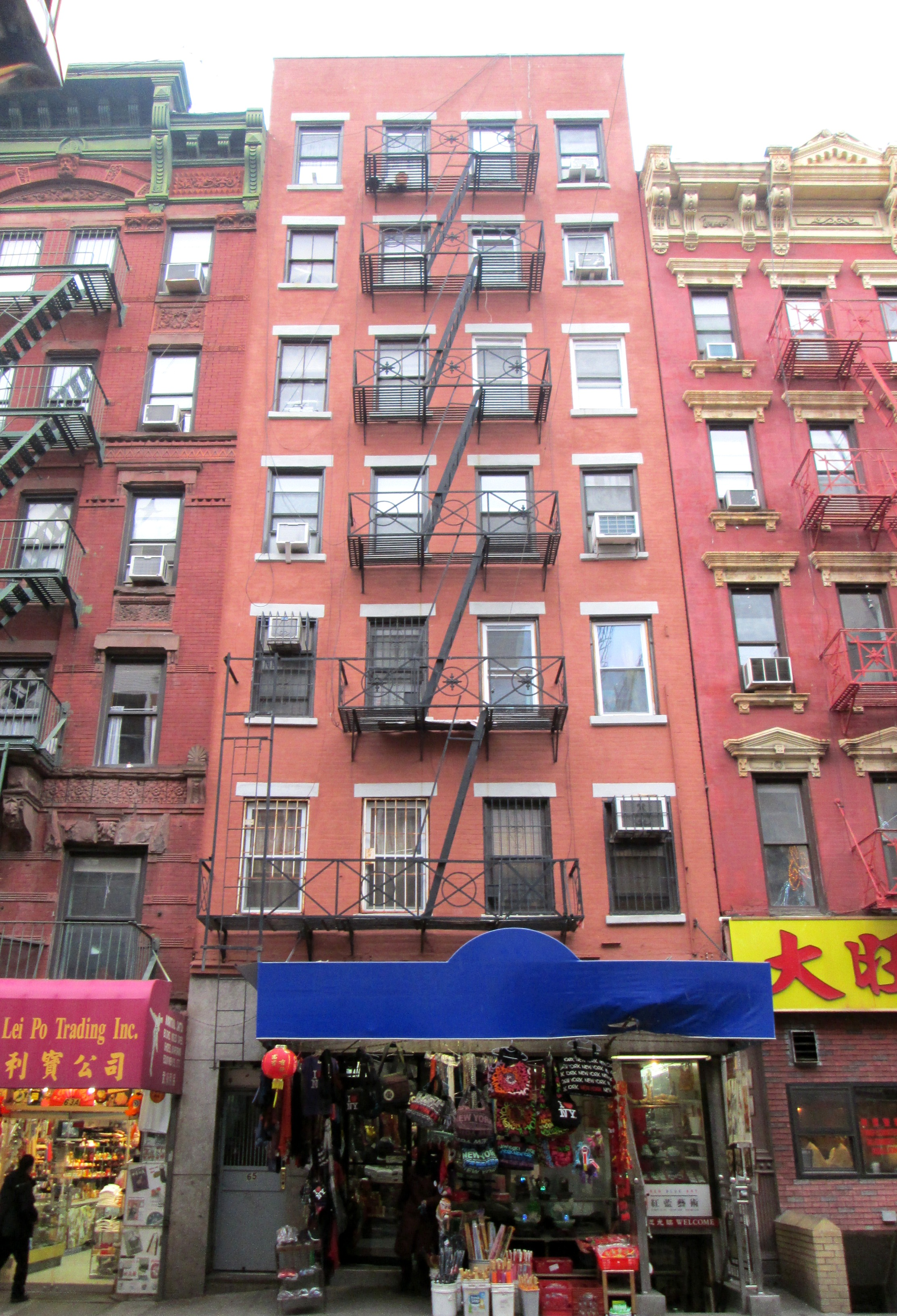
In 1824, 65 Mott Street became New York City's first building specifically built to be a tenement (2013 photo)

Ah Ken is reported to have arrived in the area in 1858; he is the first Chinese person credited as having permanently immigrated to Chinatown. As a Cantonese businessman, Ah Ken eventually founded a successful cigar store on Park Row. He was "probably one of those Chinese mentioned in gossip of the sixties [1860s] as peddling 'awful' cigars at three cents apiece from little stands along the City Hall park fence – offering a paper spill and a tiny oil lamp as a lighter", according to author Alvin Harlow in Old Bowery Days: The Chronicles of a Famous Street (1931).

Later immigrants would similarly find work as "cigar men" or billboard carriers, and Ah Ken's particular success encouraged cigar makers William Longford, John Occoo, and John Ava to also ply their trade in Chinatown, and eventually form a monopoly on the cigar trade.

It has been speculated that it may have been Ah Ken who kept a small boarding house on lower Mott Street and rented out bunks to the first Chinese immigrants to arrive in Chinatown. It was with the profits he earned as a landlord, earning an average of $100 a month, that he was able to open his Park Row smoke shop around which modern-day Chinatown would grow.

=== Historic Cantonese gangs ===
For more than 20 years, Cantonese gangs based on Mott Street terrorized Chinatown. The 1970s was the most violent gang-related period in Chinatown. Gunshots often rang out, and sometimes tourists would be unintentionally injured. Other gangs that existed were Chung Yee, Liang Shan, the Flying Dragons, the White Eagles, and the Black Eagles.

Nicky Louie, who immigrated from Hong Kong to Manhattan's Chinatown in the late 1960s, ran the Ghost Shadows gang with 50 or more members also originating from Hong Kong. By the 1970s, following a bloody battle over territory, the Ghost Shadows controlled Mott Street with the approval and affiliation of the On Leong Tong, the wealthiest and most influential gang organization in Chinatown. Working with the On Leong earned the Ghost Shadows a portion of money earned by the Tong's activities. The gangs were the guards of the On Leoong gambling houses operating in the poor conditions of lofts and basements along Mott Street. During the 1980s and 1990s, the gangs also ran a protection racket, whereby shopkeepers paid the gangs a negotiated cash fee for protection. The negotiations often involved drinking tea and were often very peaceful.

The gangs also acted as runners in the Chinatown Connection heroin trade between the Canada–US border and New York, and spread the drug throughout the state. The On Leong Tong, like most historical Chinatown gangs, also ran a legitimate enterprise, serving as a business collective known as the On Leong Chinese Merchants Association, providing services such as loans to immigrants. The Ghost Shadows were very territorial about Mott Street; in one example, the Ghost Shadows spotted a White Eagle member walking alone, kidnapped him in a car, and threw him in the East River, attempting to drown him.

== Description ==
=== In Chinatown ===
==== As Chinatown's "Main Street" ====
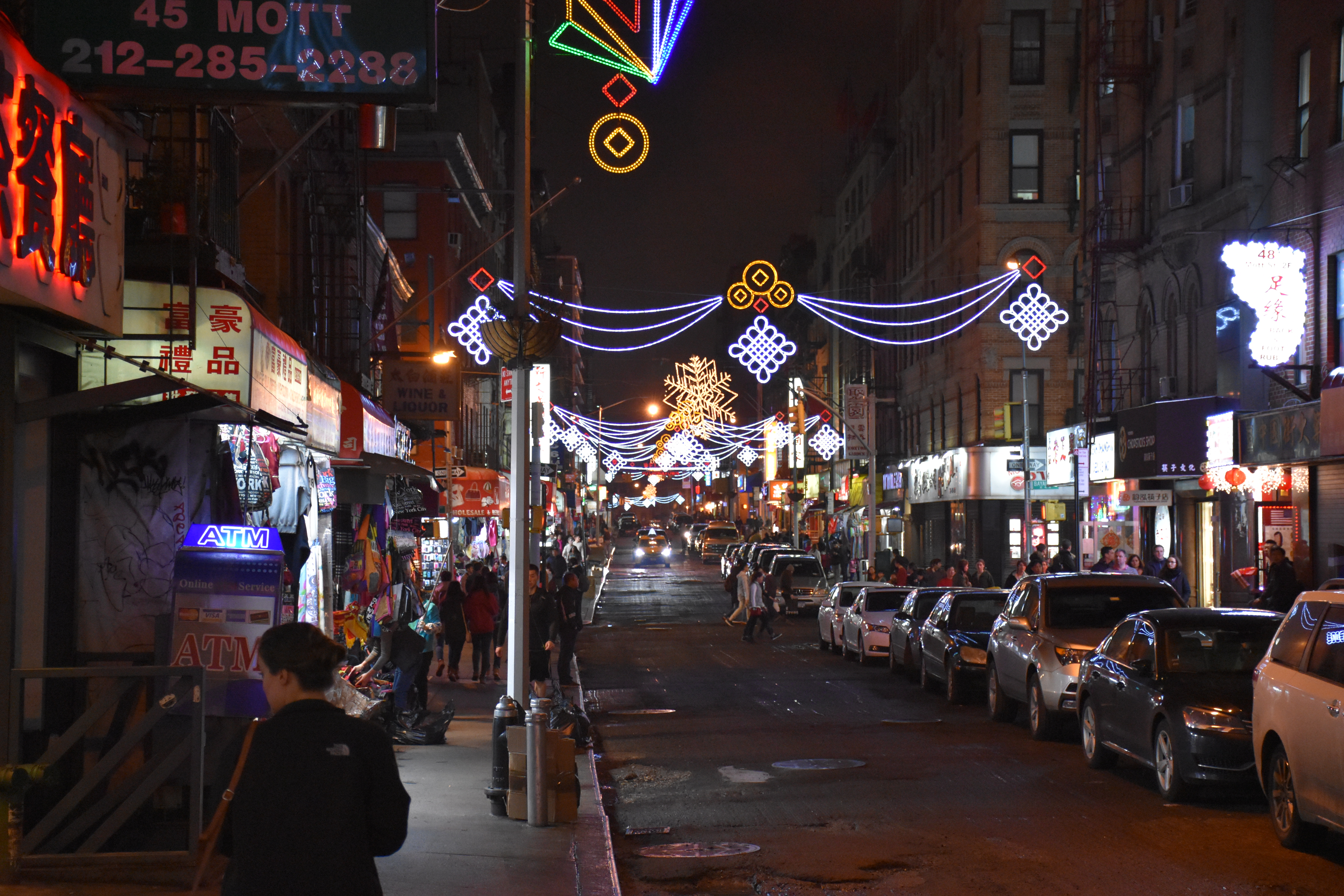
Looking north at Mott and Pell Streets at night

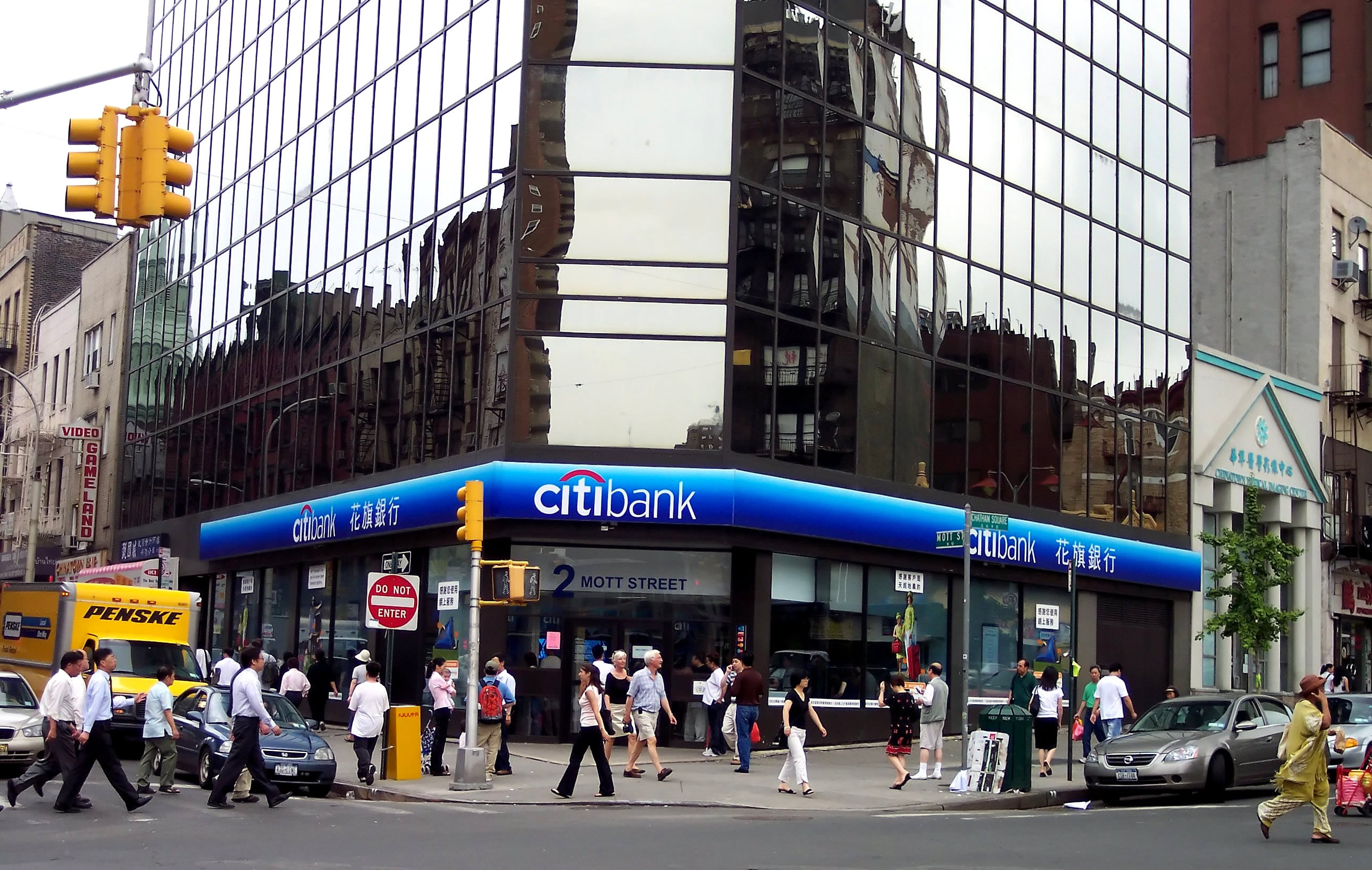
Mott Street at Chatham Square; a Citibank is in the foreground

Today, this stretch of Mott Street is lined with souvenir shops, tea houses, and restaurants catering largely to tourists. In 2003, the 32 Mott Street General Store closed due to the effects of the September 11, 2001 attacks on the Chinatown economy. The proximity of the attack along with street closures in lower Manhattan (especially the ongoing closure of Park Row under 1 Police Plaza) had cut off much business to Chinatown. 32 Mott had been the longest continuously operating store in Chinatown, established in 1891.

Mott Street north of Canal Street was historically part of Little Italy. Today it is predominantly Chinese. This section of Mott Street between roughly Canal and Broome Streets has a number of Chinese-owned fish and vegetable markets, as well as some remaining Italian businesses. The commercial establishments here cater more to the day-to-day needs of Chinatown residents than tourists. There are also shops that sell baby jackets, bamboo hats, and miniature Buddhas.

=== Little Hong Kong/Guangdong ===
This portion of Chinatown along with the rest of the western portion of Chinatown continues to be the center of the Cantonese community in New York City and the main Chinese commercial business district for the Chinatown neighborhood. The western portion of Chinatown is historically the oldest, original section of Manhattan's Chinatown, sometimes known as the Old Chinatown of Manhattan. The eastern part of Chinatown, east of the Bowery, became more fully developed due to the influx of Fuzhou immigrants during the 1980s-90s, primarily on the East Broadway and Eldridge Street portion, and together they became the new Chinatown. The Bowery, which once served as the eastern border of Chinatown, is now the divider between the Cantonese Chinatown to the west and Fuzhou Chinatown to the east.

A new branch of New York Mart opened up in August 2011 on Mott Street, although in the late 2010s, it was renamed to iFresh Supermarket. Just a block away from New York Mart is a Hong Kong Supermarket located on the corner of Elizabeth and Hester Streets. These two supermarkets are among the largest Cantonese supermarkets in Chinatown.

The historic core of the Cantonese Chinatown was bounded by Pell, Mott, Doyer, and Bayard Streets below Canal Street. The latter separated Little Italy to the north and Chinatown to the south from the 1800s until the 1950s. After 1965, newer Cantonese-speaking immigrants expanded the Cantonese Chinatown north to Broome and Kenmare Streets.

==== Culture ====
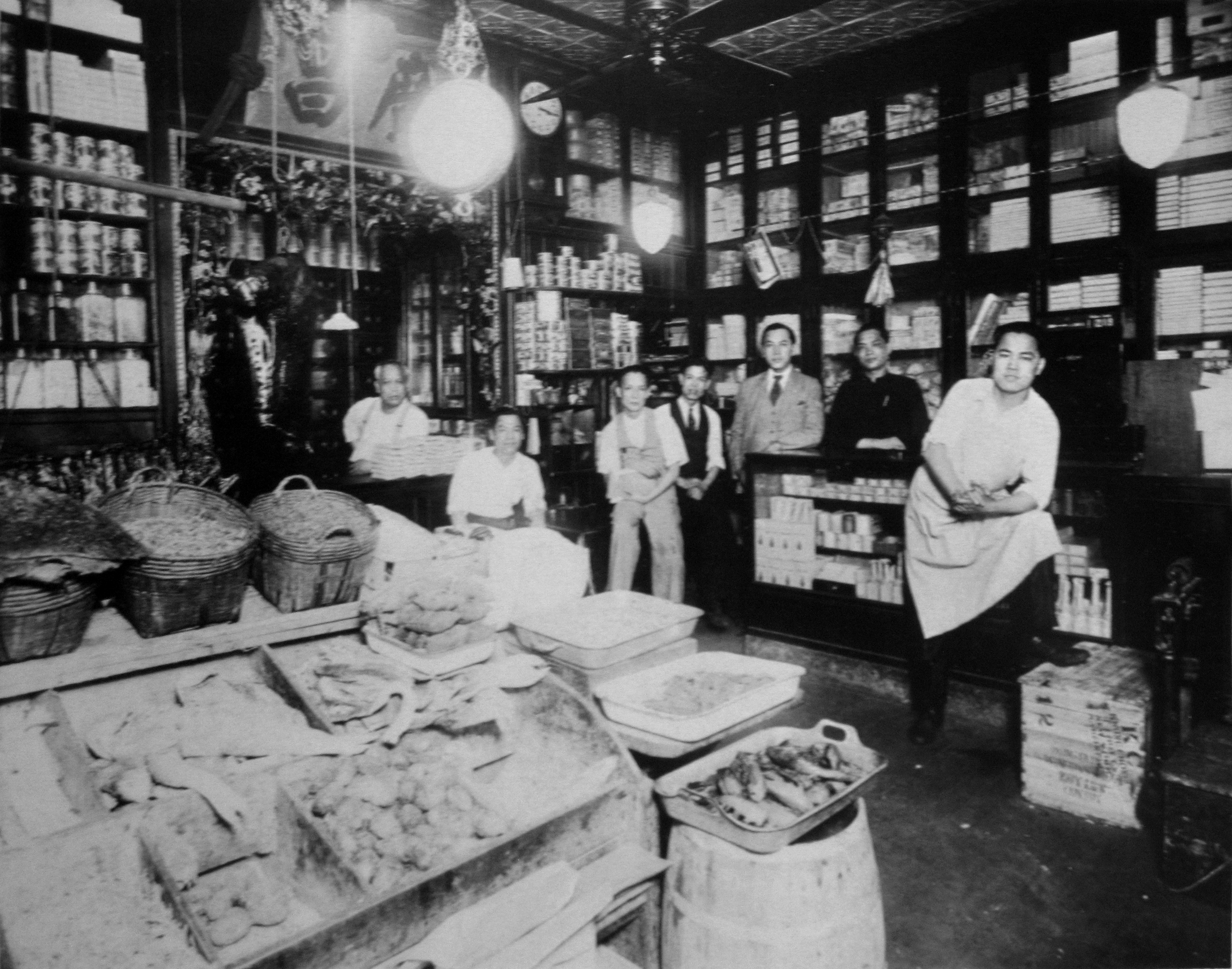
1930 Interior of Kwong Chong at 44 Mott Street

Little Guangdong or Cantonese Town are additional terms for the neighborhood, since Cantonese immigrants have come from all different parts of Guangdong province. Despite the large Fuzhou population to the eastern section of Chinatown, and the increasing prevalence of Mandarin in Chinatown in the 20th century, Cantonese is still the predominant lingua franca in Mott Street and the rest of the western portion of Chinatown. The long-established Cantonese community stretches onto Pell, Doyer, Bayard, Elizabeth, Mulberry, and Canal Streets and onto Bowery.

Due to the migration of Cantonese immigrants into the Bensonhurst and Sheepshead Bay/Homecrest neighborhoods of Brooklyn, newer Cantonese enclaves have started to emerge in those areas, including in Bensonhurst on 18th Avenue and on Bay Parkway and 86th Street, and one portion in Sheepshead/Homecrest on Avenue U, now sometimes known as Brooklyn's Little Hong Kong/Guangdong. As of the 2010s, they are still closely intermingled with other ethnic enclaves and still developing.

In recent years, the Cantonese population of Bensonhurst and Sheepshead Bay/Homecrest has surpassed the Cantonese population in Manhattan's Chinatown. Along with a declining number of Chinese residents and Chinese businesses in Manhattan Chinatown due to gentrification, Bensonhurst and Sheepshead Bay are increasingly becoming main attractions for newly arrived Cantonese immigrants in New York City.

==== Current status as a Chinese business shopping district ====
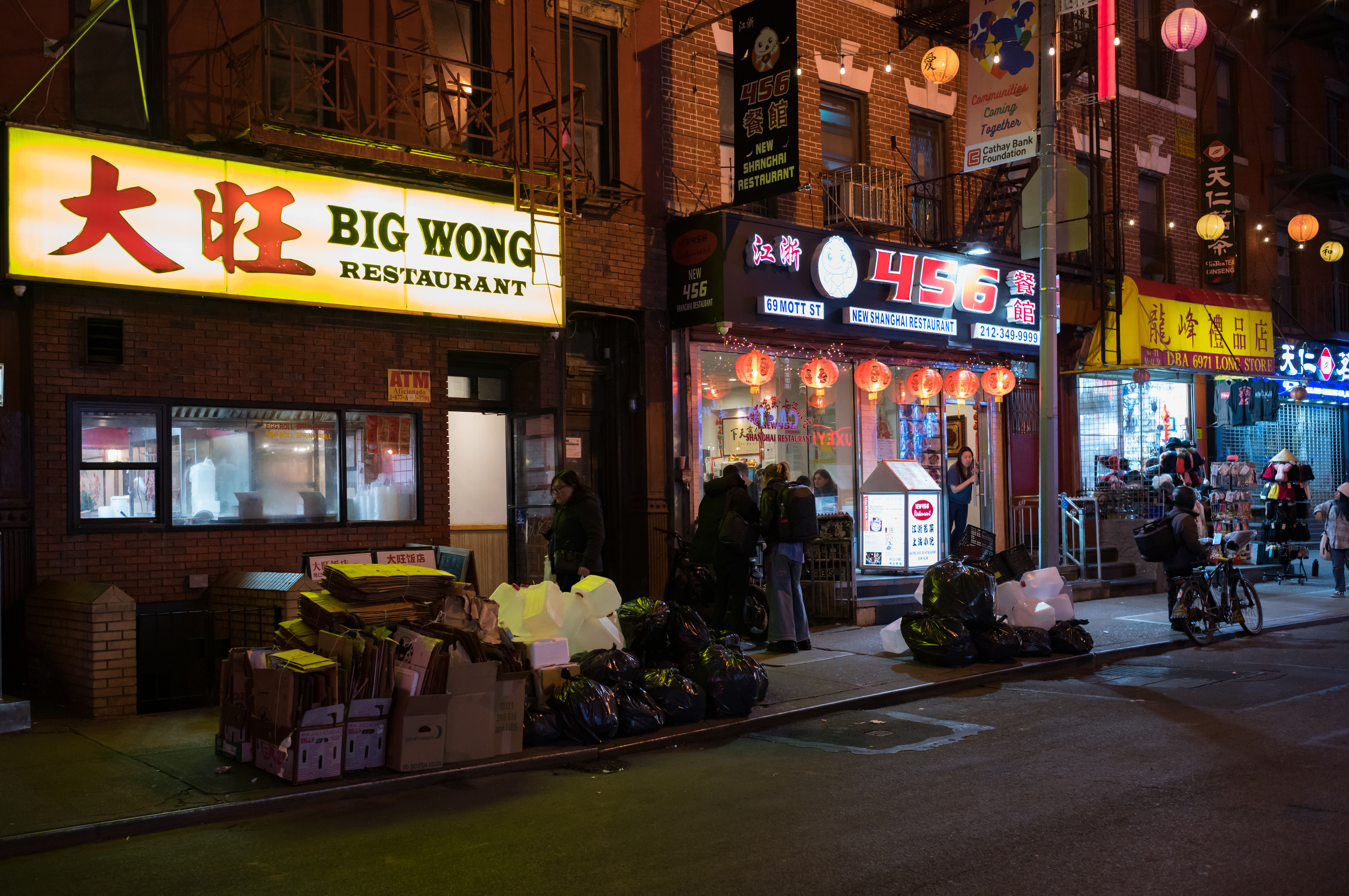
Mott Street in 2023

Despite the ongoing gentrification, Manhattan's Chinatown continues to be a busy Chinese business district with many non-Asian tourists and visitors attracted to the neighborhood to explore Chinese culture, food, and shopping, including many mainland Chinese tourists. Many Chinese residents from across the tri-state area travel to Chinatown for their shopping and business needs, and as a result, many Chinese businesses in Chinatown continue to thrive.

=== In Nolita ===
Farther to the north on Mott Street is Old St. Patrick's Cathedral, the first Catholic cathedral built in New York (consecrated 1815). The high walls surrounding the church along Mott Street attest to the tension between Protestants and Catholics in New York during the 19th century. The Church of the Transfiguration was also built here, making it the oldest Roman Catholic church in Manhattan. Mott Street also runs through Little Australia in Nolita.

Mott Street terminates at Bleecker Street in Manhattan's NoHo (North of Houston Street) neighborhood.

== Food markets and restaurants ==
Although Chinese food markets can be found in many parts of Manhattan's Chinatown, the portion of Mott Street between Hester and Grand Streets has the highest concentration of Chinese food markets centered together.

Similarly, though Chinese and Cantonese restaurants and eateries are easily found everywhere throughout Manhattan's Chinatown, Mott Street contains one of the largest concentrations of Chinese restaurants and Chinese eateries between Worth and Hester Streets. Many sell traditional Cantonese dishes, although there is a significant number of other Chinese eateries as well as those of other ethnicities. During the COVID-19 pandemic in New York City, when indoor dining was restricted, many Chinese restaurants and eateries on Mott Street offered outdoor dining service.

In November 2021, a Chinese-style food court named Mott Street Eatery opened at 98 Mott Street, the first in Manhattan's Chinatown.

== Structures ==
=== Chinese Community Centre ===
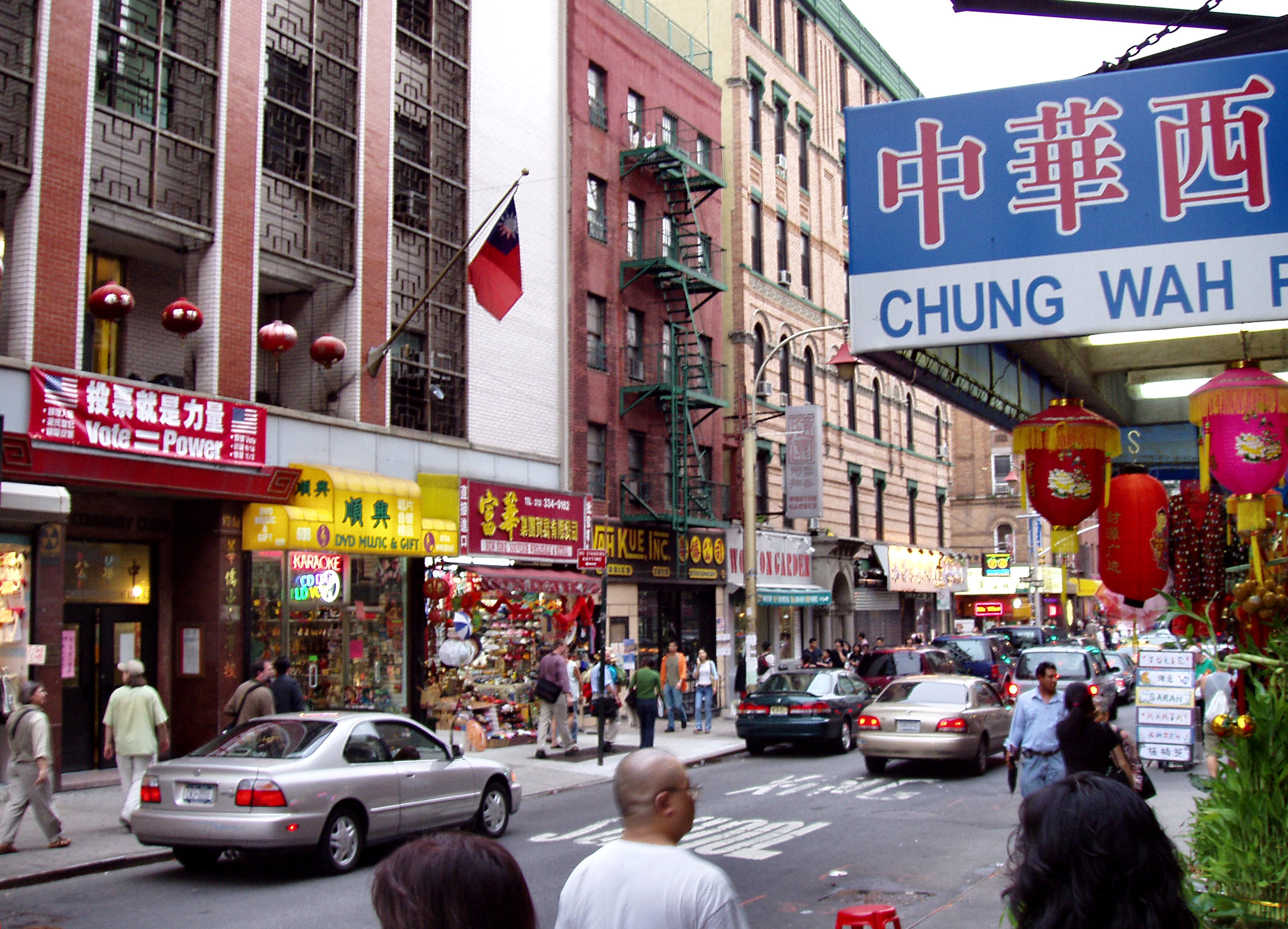
The Chinese Community Centre

The Chinese Community Centre spans 60-64 Mott Street. 62 Mott Street is home to the Chinese Consolidated Benevolent Association (CCBA), the oldest Chinese community service organization of Chinatown established in 1883. In the early history of this organization, it performed a quasi-governmental role for the Chinatown community and provided financial support and training to Chinese residents who aspired to become business owners. Today the organization provides services ranging from social services, training in personal and commercial conflict resolution and mediation, preserving Chinese culture, helping Chinese Americans integrate with mainstream groups, charity events, sponsorships for educational related activities, and advocacy for small businesses. Additional services that are provided to the community include low-cost adult English classes, naturalization services, and free tax services.

The New York Chinese School is at 64 Mott Street. Located inside the CCBA building, it is the largest Chinese school in North America and was established in 1909 during the Qing dynasty of China as an overseas Chinese school. It is Chinatown's center of academic learning on Chinese culture and history. Both Cantonese and Mandarin classes are offered at this school, with the Mandarin programs challenging the longtime traditional dominance of Cantonese programs within the school. This educational institution is affiliated with the CCBA due to its location.

=== Historical businesses ===
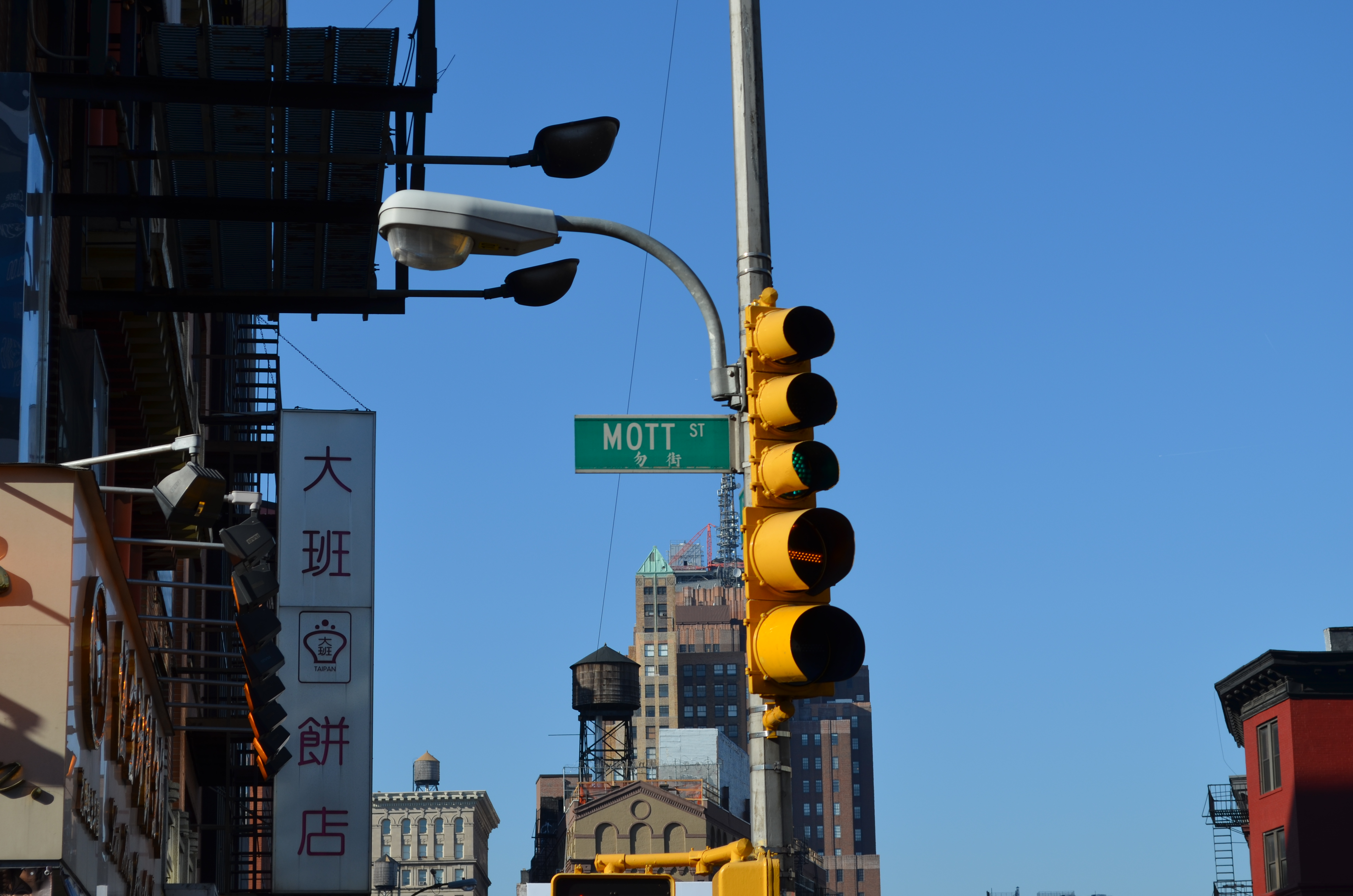
Street sign of Mott Street, showing alternative Chinese name, at the intersection with Canal Street

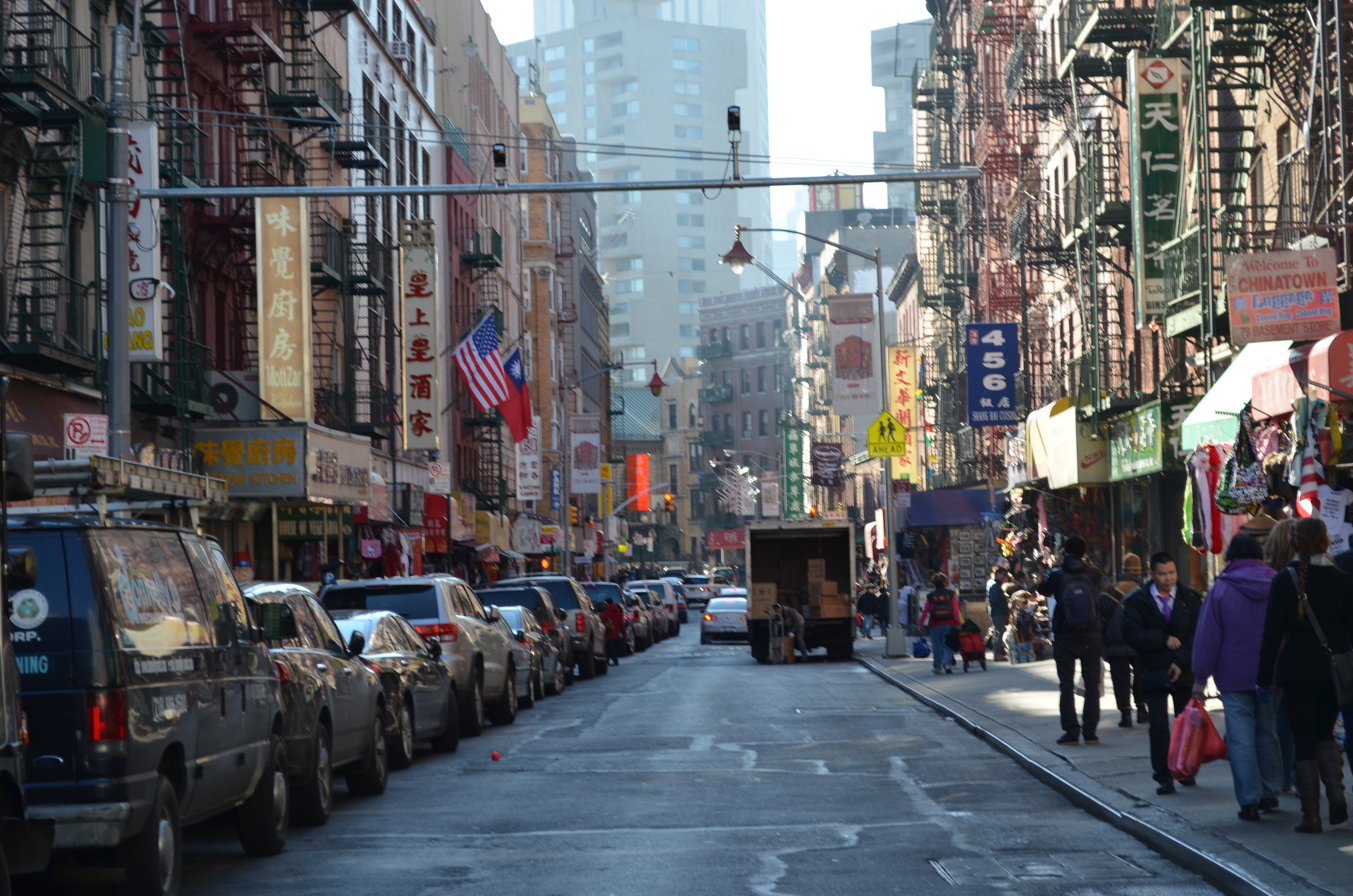
From Canal Street, looking south at Mott Street

By 1903, there were four Chinese restaurants established on Mott Street: Port Arthur, Tuxedo, Imperial, and Chinese Quick Lunch. Other early Chinese restaurants included Chatham on Doyers Street and Savoy & Oriental Restaurant on Pell Street. These restaurants competed with each other for business in the Chinatown community.

==== Chinese Tuxedo Restaurant ====
In 1897, the Chinese Tuxedo Restaurant opened as a high-class Chinese American restaurant. The outside design of the restaurant's entrance was a colossal Chinese-style awning, crowned with a large wooden carved Chinese dragon. At the entrance, there was a multi-colored stained glass sign with the word Restaurant on it.

Postcard pictures of this entrance were often distributed to customers of the restaurant for free. The restaurant was located on a balcony with carved teakwood panels that appeared to leap out from the rest of the building, with the purpose of gaining the attention of people strolling through the streets below. There were often many American customers in this restaurant.

The restaurant's interior was designed with mosaic tile floors and pressed tin ceilings with a chandelier and a large dragon design. The dining room displayed potted plants surrounding a water fountain, which contained wooden birds supported by a wooden dragon stand to make the restaurant appealing and for feng shui. There were teakwood windscreens behind the fountain with hand-carved double-layered wood molding that were used as room dividers with curtains set up on them. Tabletops were made of inlaid marble.

The restaurant also had a private dining room and displayed American advertisements, such as one example on record for Horton's ice cream. The restaurant offered both English and Chinese menus. One on record listed an omelet stuffed with chicken, lobster, and ham at the cost of $2.00. At the time, there was an elevated train rail conveniently located next to the restaurant.

The name was revived in 2016 with the opening of the contemporary Chinese Tuxedo restaurant on nearby Doyers Street.

==== Port Arthur Restaurant ====
External images
- Port Arthur Restaurant Color version of Port Arthur Restaurant
- Port Arthur Restaurant – Black and white version of Port Arthur Restaurant
- Port Arthur Restaurant – Interior view of Port Arthur Restaurant

The Port Arthur Restaurant was also established in 1897 and operated for more than 85 years. Chu Gam Fai was the original owner who started the business. The restaurant was named after Port Arthur (now Lüshun), a city on the northeast coast of China where in 1904-1905 the Siege of Port Arthur marked the first victory of Asian power over European power. The entrance to the restaurant at 7-9 Mott Street was marked by an ornate pagoda-style awning and the building's Chinese pagoda-style balcony would eventually become a trademark for the restaurant. Eventually, an escalator was established in the restaurant to make it easier for customers to access the second and third floors, where diners were seated.

The Port Arthur was the first Chinese restaurant in New York City's Chinatown to obtain a liquor license. The restaurant was known for its delicious Chinese-style dishes and delicacies as well as for its authentic Chinese style wall decor, inlaid pearl mahogany tables, teakwood chairs, ornate carved wooden panels, windscreens, lanterns, and chandeliers.

The third floor dining rooms were reserved for private parties and banquets, where many local Chinese residents held wedding parties and family ceremonial dinners. The East Hall upper dining room had a baby grand piano for entertainment, and by 1910, it was redesigned to accommodate long banquet tables. The West Hall upper dining room had no walls or screens to divide the space and each table was set up with only four seats, to accommodate smaller groups. There was also a special upper floor room for a bride's traditional change into different red dresses for various stages of the wedding reception.

The second floor dining area was for smaller groups of customers or after-hours slummers, American tourists in search for exotic adventures. The restaurant also served a special luncheon on the lower dining floor every day from 11am-3pm except for holidays and Sundays.

The restaurant was very conveniently located near an elevated train at Chatham Square and a subway station at Worth Street.

==== Soy Kee & Company ====
Below the Port Arthur Restaurant, there was a store named Soy Kee & Company serving as an importer and exporter of Chinese goods, selling curios, chinaware, lamps, imported Chinese silks, embroideries, ivory carvings, imported Chinese teas, candies, dried fruits, coffees, canned foods, kimono, pajamas, and other types of accessories. Soy Kee & Company was originally located on 36 Pell Street, then moved to Mott Street in 1897 and then eventually moved outside of the Chinatown neighborhood.

==== Mott Street General Store ====
External images
- Mott Street General Store – Front Pictures of Mott Street General Store
- Mott Street General Store – Insider view of Mott Street General Store

In 1891, a Chinese man named Lok Lee opened up the Mott Street General Store. This was the gathering place for the earliest Chinese immigrants to socialize and maintain their kin roots with family and friends. It was especially important because early Chinatown was primarily a bachelor's society. Due to discrimination within the immigration laws at the time, Chinese men were not allowed to bring their families to America.

This was the oldest Chinese store in the neighborhood and remained there for more than 100 years. The store's Chinese name was Quong Yuen Shing & Co (Chinese: 廣源盛; pinyin: guǎng yuán shèng; lit. 'abundant source', 'magnificent') and was located at 32 Mott Street. The architecture designs rarely changed, with some of the original wooden cabinetry remaining, carved arches above the counter, formal paintings of Chinese women hanging on walls, and the original ticking clock from when the shop first opened continuing throughout its tenure. The apothecary shelves that displayed traditional styles of Chinese rice bowls, tea sets, and jade dragons still remained as well. A carved woodwork that twisted around the counter was where herbal remedies were once sold. The store sign that once took up the storefront's two box bays are held at the Museum of Chinese in America. In 2003, it closed due to the effects of the September 11 attacks on the Chinatown economy. In 2004, the historic business reopened under the name, Good Fortune Gifts.

== See also ==
- Chinatown, Brooklyn
  - Brooklyn's Bensonhurst Little Hong Kong/Guangdong
  - Brooklyn's Homecrest Little Hong Kong/Guangdong
- Chinatown, Flushing
- Chinatowns in the United States
- List of Chinatowns in the United States
- Little Australia
