= Cooperative State Research, Education, and Extension Service =

Former U.S. government agency (1994–2009)

Agency overview
- Formed: October 13, 1994
- Preceding agencies: USDA Cooperative State Research Service; USDA Extension Service
- Dissolved: October 1, 2009
- Superseding agency: National Institute of Food and Agriculture
- Jurisdiction: United States of America
- Headquarters: Washington, DC
- Parent department: United States Department of Agriculture

The Cooperative State Research, Education, and Extension Service (CSREES) was an agency within the U.S. Department of Agriculture (USDA). The Department of Agriculture Reorganization Act of 1994 established CSREES by combining the former Cooperative State Research Service and the Extension Service into a single agency. Following the passage of the 2008 Farm Bill, CSREES was replaced by the National Institute of Food and Agriculture (NIFA). In 2009, NIFA assumed all responsibilities of CSREES, including oversight of the Cooperative Extension System.

== Mission and priorities ==
The mission of CSREES was "to advance knowledge for agriculture, the environment, human health and well-being, and communities by supporting research, education, and extension programs in the Land-Grant University System and other partner organizations." CSREES did not conduct research directly. Instead, it provided funding opportunities and program leadership to universities, extension services, and other research organizations to support the advancement of knowledge.

CSREES sought to address "quality of life problems" American communities. CSREES research and education supported efforts to improve agricultural productivity, promote rural development, and advance public health. CSREES organized its research and education programs around thirteen national emphasis areas:

1. Agriculture and Food Biosecurity
2. Agricultural Systems
3. Animals and Animal Products
4. Biotechnology and Genomics
5. Economics and Commerce
6. Education
7. Families, Youth, and Communities
8. Food, Nutrition, and Health
9. International Programs
10. Natural Resources and Environment
11. Pest Management
12. Plants and Plant Products
13. Technology and Engineering

== Federal funding assistance ==
CSREES appropriated federal funds in support of research, education, and extension through three primary funding mechanisms:

- Formula funds were annual federal appropriations to land-grant universities. The amount of funding that each institution received annually was often determined by a statutorily-defined formula.
- Competitive grants were awarded to support research, extension, and higher education. Recipients were selected through a peer-review process, with eligibility and requirements varying by program. Major competitive grant opportunities included the National Research Initiative, Sustainable Agriculture Research and Education (SARE), Higher Education Challenge Grants, and the Small Business Innovation Research (SBIR) program.
- Non-competitive grants and special projects were often directed by Congress. These funds were intended to support specific institutions, regions, or topics of national importance. These included Special Research Grants, Evans-Allen funds for 1890 institutions, and initiatives for other minority-serving institutions like Tribal Colleges.

== Program leadership ==
CSREES employed national program leaders to assist communities in identify and meeting the research, extension, and education priorities of communities across the United States. Program leaders focused on issues that affect agricultural producers, small businesses, youth, families, and communities. CSREES national program leaders served four main functions:

1. Collaborating with partners and stakeholders to identify issues requiring federal support.
2. Designing and directing programs to address emerging or ongoing challenges through science-based knowledge.
3. Administering and managing research, education, and extension programs.
4. Evaluating the quality, outcomes, and impacts of funded activities.

== Educational programs ==
CSREES oversaw educational programs to advance teaching and learning in subjects related to the agency's national emphasis areas. A key goal of CSREES' educational programs was to develop the scientific workforce of the future. CSREES collaborated with land grant universities, public institutions, and private sector partners to provide educational programming and leadership.

In 1997, CSREES implemented a teaching partnership, which sought to "support human capital development through programs that strengthen agricultural and natural resource sciences literacy in K-12 education, improve higher education curricula, modernize institutional academic capacity, and increase the diversity and quality of future graduates to enter the scientific and professional workforce." CSREES also supported Agriculture in the Classroom (AITC), which was established in 1981 to promote agricultural literacy in classrooms across the country.

CSREES’ educational programs focused on preparing a workforce that was prepared to meet the future needs of the U.S. food, agriculture, and natural resources industries. These efforts included broadening student recruitment, expanding training opportunities in high-demand fields, adapting curricula to align with innovative technologies, and providing students with the communication, teamwork, and practical skills necessary to advance scientific discovery.

== Cooperative Extension System ==
The Cooperative Extension System (CES) is a nationwide educational and agricultural extension network in the United States. CES operates as a partnership between federal, state, and local entities which collaborate in support of the dissemination of research-based knowledge from land-grant universities to individuals, families, and communities.

The Smith-Lever Act of 1914 established the Cooperative Extension System as a partnership between the federal government, state agricultural colleges, and county-level extension agents. The original goal of CES was to help rural Americans identify and solve problems related to farming, home life, and community development. Its mission has since evolved to address a broad range of contemporary issues, including youth development, nutrition and health, environmental stewardship, and community resilience.

Since the dissolution of CSREES, CES has continued its operations under the direction of NIFA.

=== Land-grant universities ===
CES provides public outreach on behalf of the nation's land-grant universities. Land-grant universities were first established by the Morrill Act of 1862 in order to expand education in agricultural and mechanical sciences. The First Morrill Act provided 30,000 acres of land to each state per congressional representative. States were able to sell this land and allocate the profits towards the creation of public colleges offering instruction in agriculture and mechanics.

The Second Morrill Act of 1890 sought to promote educational equity within the land-grant system. It required states to either admit Black students to their existing land-grant colleges or establish separate land-grant institutions for Black students to receive instruction in agriculture and mechanics. As a result, many Historically Black Colleges and Universities (HBCUs) were founded and designated as land-grant institutions.

The Equity in Educational Land-Grant Status Act of 1994 further expanded the land-grant university system by designating certain Tribal Colleges and Universities (TCUs) as land-grant institutions. 1994 land-grant institutions are colleges and universities created by American Indian tribes that primarily serve Native students.

== Transition from CSREES to NIFA ==
The National Institute of Food and Agriculture (NIFA) was established in the 2008 Farm Bill. When NIFA was formally launched on October 1, 2009, it assumed all operations and responsibilities that were previously administered by the Cooperative State Research, Education, and Extension Service.

== See also ==
- National Institute of Food and Agriculture
- Cooperative Extension System (United States)
- Agricultural Extension
- Community food projects
- List of land-grant universities
- National Association Of County Agricultural Agents
