= Community gardening in the United States =

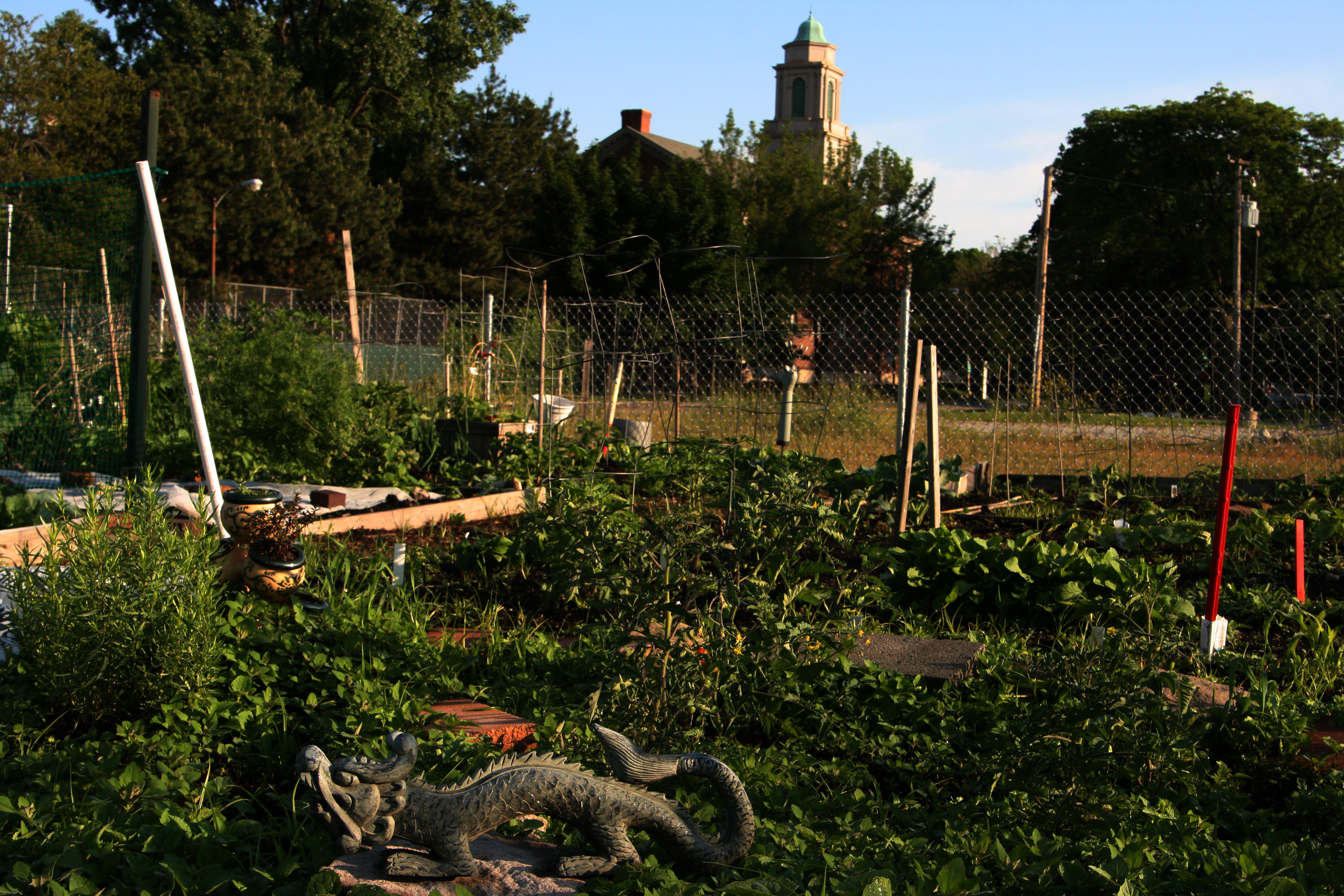
61st St. Community Garden, Chicago

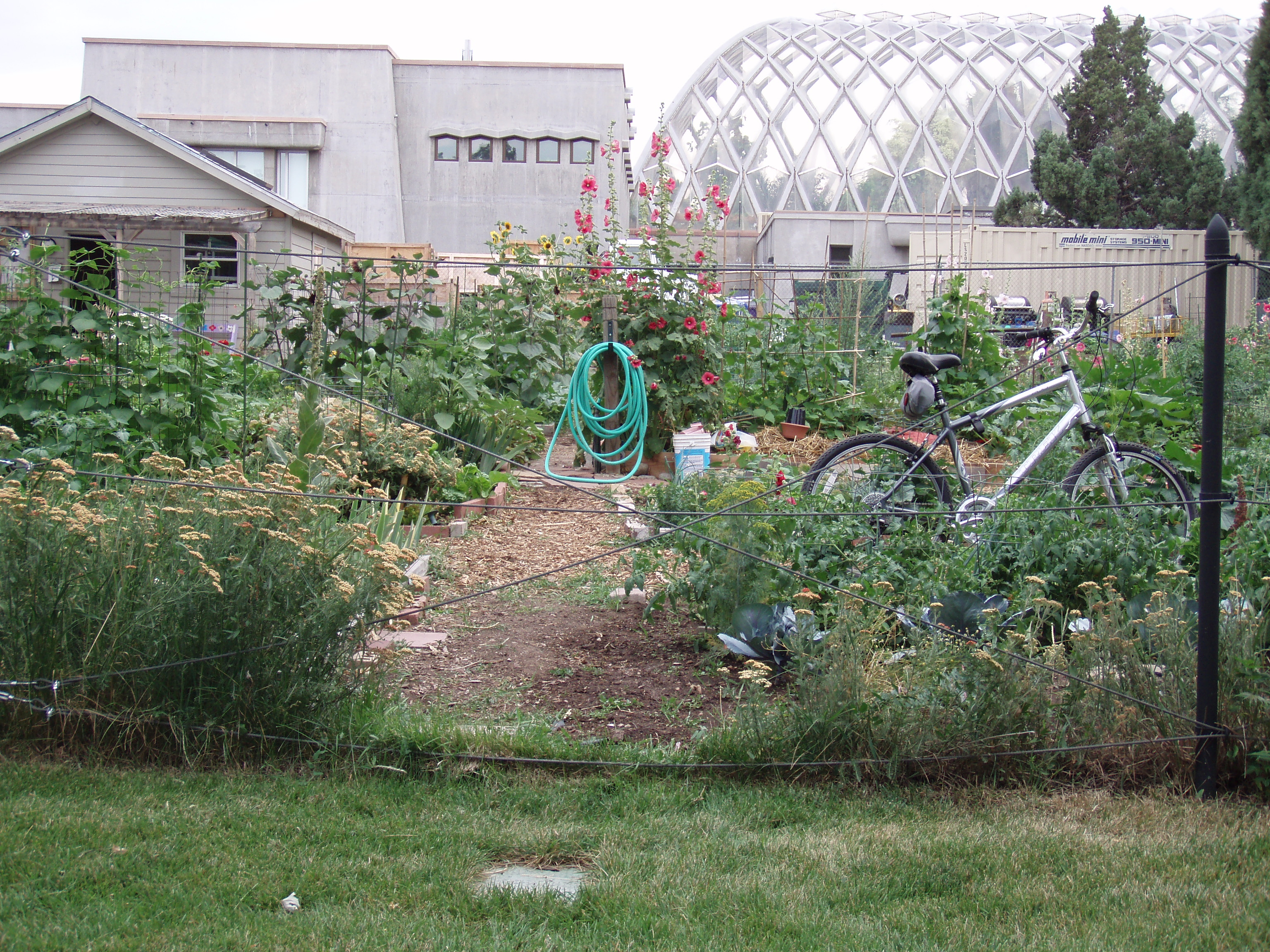
Community garden, Denver, Colorado

Community gardens in the United States benefit both gardeners and society at large. Community gardens provide fresh produce to gardeners and their friends and neighbors. They provide a place of connection to nature and to other people. In a wider sense, community gardens provide green space, a habitat for insects and animals, sites for gardening education, and beautification of the local area. Community gardens provide access to land to those who otherwise could not have a garden, such as apartment-dwellers, the elderly, and the homeless. Many gardens resemble European allotment gardens, with plots or boxes where individuals and families can grow vegetables and flowers, including a number which began as victory gardens during World War II. Other gardens are worked as community farms with no individual plots at all, similar to urban farms.

== Overview ==
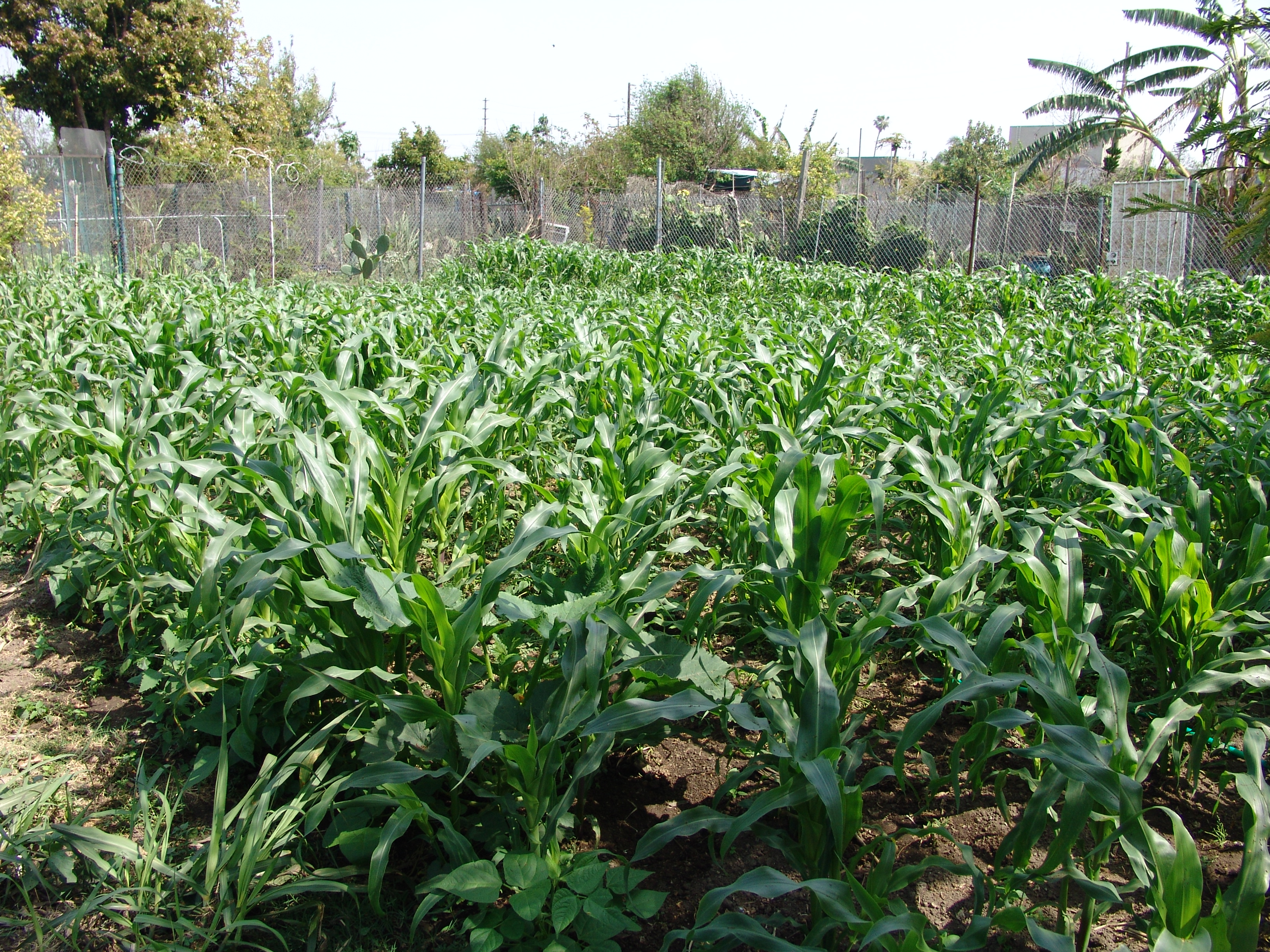
Crops at the former South Central Farm in Los Angeles, California

A community garden is any piece of land gardened by a group of people. The majority of gardens in community gardening programs are collections of individual garden plots, frequently between 3 m × 3 m (9.8 ft × 9.8 ft) and 6 m × 6 m (20 ft × 20 ft). This holds true whether they are sponsored by public agencies, city departments, large non-profits, or (most commonly) a coalition of different entities and groups. Some gardens have common-area features, such as orchards, beehives, and plots that are tended by children or volunteers for the community.

Whether the garden is run as a co-op by the gardeners themselves (common in New York City, Boston and other East Coast cities), or managed by a public or non-profit agency, plot holders are typically asked to pay a fee each year and to abide by a set of rules. Fees typically cover water costs, insurance, and infrastructure repairs.

Many gardens have communal activities such as meetings, workdays, fundraisers, and social gatherings. Community garden organizers typically say that "growing community" is as important as growing vegetables; or, as the American Community Gardening Association (ACGA) puts it: "In community gardening, 'community' comes first."

Community gardening in the United States overlaps, to some extent, with the related but distinct movement to encourage local food production, local farmers' markets, and community supported agriculture farms (CSAs). Leases and rules prevent most, though not all, community gardeners from selling their produce commercially, as many community gardens are viewed (and are often set up as) nonprofit organizations. However, such gardens may donate fresh fruits and vegetables to local food pantries, cooperatives, and homeless members of their community.

Depending on their size, community gardens host local farmers markets where the farmers provide space-intensive crops such as corn or potatoes. In turn, small farmers can reach a wider audience and consumer base by drawing on community gardeners and their contacts. Although the two approaches are distinct, both can be effective ways to produce local food in urban areas, safeguard green space, and contribute to food security. Community gardens also increase environmental aesthetics, promote neighborhood attachment, and social involvement.

Similar to the practice of reclaiming bombed areas for community gardens (practiced during WWII in the ghettos of Eastern Europe), community groups have reclaimed abandoned or vacant lots for garden plots in American inner-cities. In these cases, groups have subsequently leased from a municipality that claims the property, or claimed squatter's rights or a right to subsistence not currently recognized by the legal system.

Community gardens often face pressure due to economic development, rising land values, and decreased city government budgets. In some cases, they have responded to the changes by forming nonprofit organizations to provide assistance and by building gardens on city park spaces and school yards. Another source of pressure in some locations is the cost of water, one of the gardens' main expenses.

== History ==
The history of community gardening in the US dates back to the early 18th century, when Moravians created a community garden in the community of Bethabara, near modern Winston-Salem, North Carolina. This garden is still active and open for visitors today. Community gardening was also a practice of Native American tribes and First Nations peoples, who likely gardened with a community approach for generations before the arrival of immigrants. Exemplifying this, Gilbert L. Wilson's book Buffalo Bird Woman's Garden paints a picture of gardens among the Hidatsa.

In the 1890s, Detroit became the first city to use vacant lots for a municipally sponsored urban gardening programs. Known as "Pingree's Potato Patches" after Mayor Hazen Pingree, the program was formed as a response to the 1893 economic recession which left the city's industrial laborers unemployed. Observing the success of Detroit's gardening program, Boston and San Francisco later adopted similar programs. The latter cities' programs, however, were temporary programs aimed at helping the poor.

As adult interest in gardens began to wane, there was a renewed interest in children's gardening with the advocacy of Fannie Griscom Parsons in New York City. In DeWitt Clinton Park, Parsons created a large educational garden in the early 1900s as a way to "show how willing and anxious children are to work, and to teach them in their work some necessary civic virtues; private care of public property, economy, honesty, application concentration, self-government, civic pride, justice, the dignity of labor, and the love of nature by opening to their minds the little we know of her mysteries, more wonderful than any fairy tale."

During World War I and World War II, Victory gardens were planted on public land to meet some of the domestic need for food. The term "community garden" came into use to describe collectively grown gardens and gardens with individual plots during World War I.

In the 1960s and 70s, community gardens were a result of grassroots organizations that promoted environmental stewardship and revitalized urban neighborhoods. In 1978, the American Community Gardening Association (ACGA) was formed to share information and resources among community gardeners and to form a nationwide network of said gardeners.

From the mid-1970s through the early 1990s, community gardening, in a select number of major American cities, enjoyed federal financial support, though many programs struggled to find funding. The loss of the federal program increased the challenge of finding funding to support gardens, as the dues rarely cover all the garden's expenses.

== In social movements ==
Community gardens are seen as valuable in food systems movements such as food justice, food sovereignty, food security, and agroecology. Community urban farms also provide a medium for gender empowerment, racial inclusion, and alternative power structures. Food system movements are happening beyond the United States, transnationally in the Global North and the Global South in regions of Latin America, Asia, and Africa. The globalization of food production in the previous century has also globalized and connected community organizations and international NGOs working on food systems and food sovereignty.

== Benefits of gardening ==
=== Cultural ===
Community gardens create a common space for people from diverse cultures, nationalities, and gender identities to come together and create strong community. Gardeners learn about new plants from each other, share seeds and plants, and expand their knowledge of each other's cultures and cuisines. This knowledge and cultural exchange increases community connectedness and the cultural specificity of foods grown.

=== Economic ===
As the majority of the United States' farmers reach retirement age, community gardens play an active role in informing a new generation to become involved with growing food. Diversifying the food system with community gardens and other methods of urban agriculture will benefit the economy and create competition between product quality and value.

Green spaces in cities often increase the land value of an area and contribute to gentrification. Gentrification, in turn, can lead to increased density and pressure on the land owner of the garden to develop it.

Being a member of a community garden requires time, energy, and some money for dues, seeds, plants, and fertilizers. Some community members may work multiple jobs or have family responsibilities, and have little to no extra time to commit. However, many gardens have sliding scales for dues, or have funding that subsidizes low-income gardeners.

=== Environmental ===
Food composting positively impacts the environment. A case study conducted in 2019 by the University of Illinois-Urbana Champaign and the University of Illinois at Chicago determined the impact from decentralized food composting in the City of Chicago. In 2015, the City of Chicago implemented an ordinance allowing acceptance and processing of food scraps at community gardens and urban farms. Approximately 16% of the food waste was processed at 86 registered compost facilities in 2019. The study estimates capacity for food composting could reach 27% of the city's residential food waste, resulting in an estimated savings of over $4 million per year. In addition to the financial cost savings, other benefits include reduced greenhouse gases because of reduced refuse pickup, compost as energy filled fertilizer for community gardens and urban farms, and waste reduction into landfills. However, food composting is not suitable for all community gardens because it requires a certain amount of inputs, a designated composting area, and regular maintenance, in return for a relatively small yield.

Community gardens have the potential to positively impact the areas around them. If gardeners employ organic and environmentally conscious techniques, community gardens can be a step away from chemically dependent and wasteful food systems. Gardens that produce crops and vegetables act to reduce the need for fossil-fuel intensive storage and delivery of food to local community members. As researcher Montenegro de Wit states, sustainable agriculture should not be "contained to the countryside." By bringing these techniques into communities, learning opportunities arise as well as the chance of converting land from an "emissions-source" to a "carbon sink", as Robert Biel writes.

Community gardens provide miniature ecological reserves with flowers and food for many kinds of birds, insects and animals. Larger gardens with adequate space may host beehives.

=== Health ===
Community gardens benefit community food access by enhancing nutrition and physical activity. The U.S. Department of Health and Human Services recommends eating more dark green vegetables, orange vegetables, legumes, and fruits; eating less refined grains, fat, and calories; and obtaining 60 minutes of physical activity on most days. Recent public health evaluations show community gardens as a promising approach to promote healthy behaviors. This is particularly important in establishing healthy behaviors among children, given the rise of childhood obesity. A pilot study in Los Angeles showed a gardening and nutrition intervention improved dietary intake in children and reduced body mass index.

Community gardens benefit community food security by providing residents with a culturally acceptable, nutritionally adequate diet through a sustainable food system. Community garden initiatives have inspired cities to enact policies for water use, improved access to produce, strengthened community building skills, and created culturally appropriate education programs that help elevate the community's collective consciousness about public health. In impoverished urban areas especially, produce harvested from community gardens provides a nutritious alternative to what Nancy Janovicek calls "the industrial diet," which consists of cheap and accessible options like fast food.

Professor Jill Litt and colleagues at the University of Colorado School of Public Health evaluated the effects on community gardening in the Denver metro area by studying the social environment, community building, and fruit and vegetable intake. Community gardeners were more likely than home gardeners and non-gardeners to meet the national recommendations of fruit and vegetable intake. Semi structured interviews carried out by Teig et al. revealed that Denver community gardeners felt a high level of trust between members of the garden and a strong sense of community. Furthermore, gardeners were involved in community voluntary efforts and donated surplus produce to populations without access to fresh produce.

=== Social ===
Agricultural activity in communities is a way of promoting self-sufficiency, as well as community empowerment and involvement. Additionally, producing food, helping the environment, and creating green spaces in cities contributes to an overall increase in happiness. Space in cities and communities reserved for growing vegetables and flowers promotes wellbeing, neighborliness, and the protection of nature.

== Resources ==
The American Community Gardening Association is a non-profit organization promoting community gardens in the United States and Canada through various support programs including advocacy, training, conferences and events, and resources. Master gardener programs in all 50 U.S. states and 8 Canadian provinces are volunteer programs that train individuals in the science and art of gardening, and have resources to help people set up and manage a new garden. The University of Illinois Extension provides resources for Cook County, Illinois, as well as a video series, titled Community Gardens - 10 Steps to Successful Community Gardens, to assist organizations or groups who are researching the process of starting their own community garden. The University of Missouri Extension created a Community Gardening Tool Kit that includes a step by step guide, forms, and a list of resources. In addition, the National Agricultural Library of the United States Department of Agriculture provides numerous resources on their website for community gardens including financial resources.

Author and community garden advocate, Ms. LaManda Joy, wrote several books, including Start a Community Food Garden, The Essential Handbook which offers all the information needed to start a community garden (available in print and audio books). Grants provide additional financial resources for starting and maintaining community gardens. State and local governments may offer financial assistance to community gardens.

== Examples ==
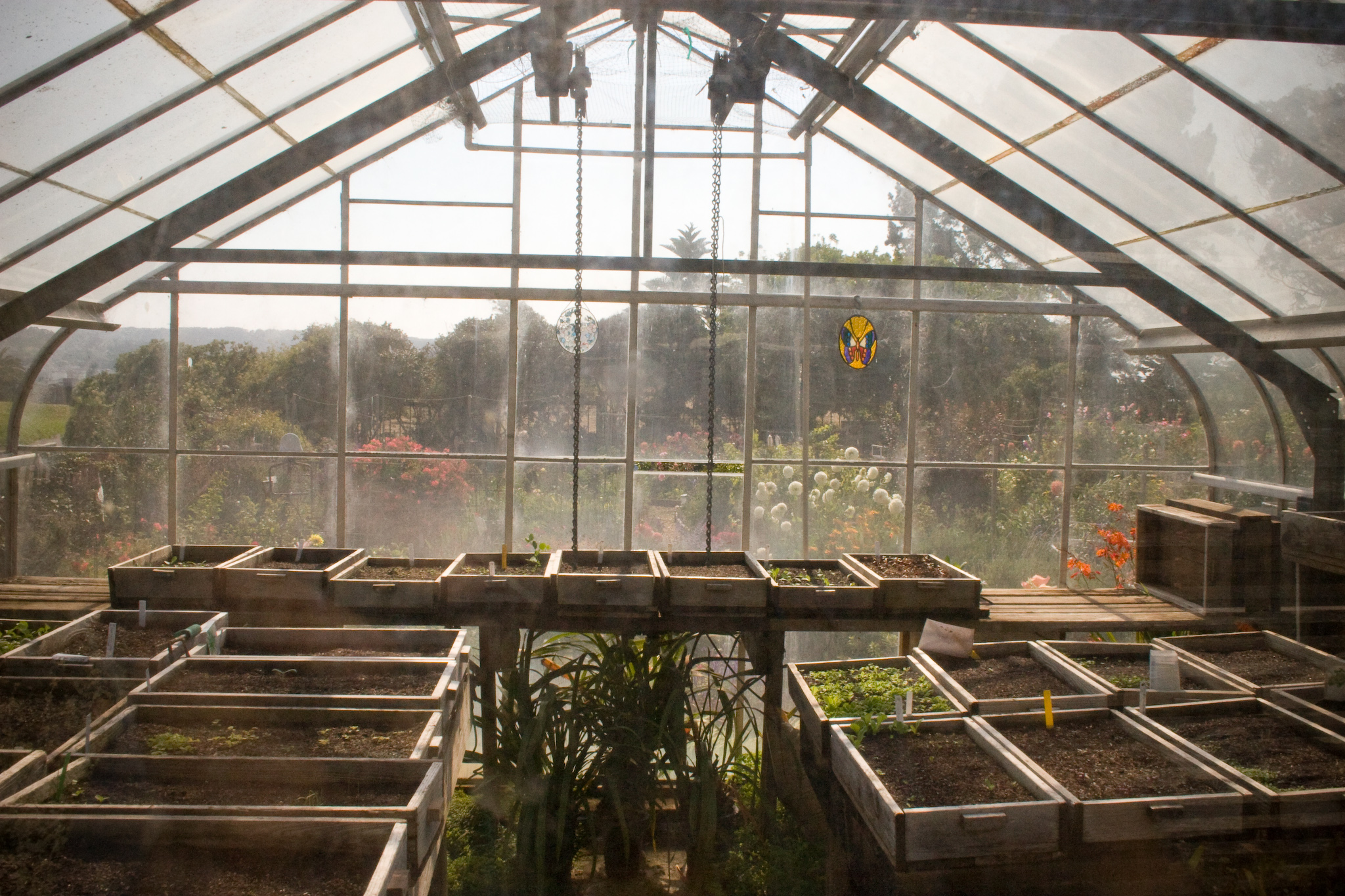
Fort Mason Community Garden, San Francisco, 2008

The American Community Garden Association maintains lists of community gardens in the United States. Community gardens can vary in shape, size, and function. Some of the largest community gardens in the nation are reported to be Shiloh Field Community Garden in Denton, Texas, measuring at 14.5 acres of land, and DeKalb County Community Gardens in DeKalb, Illinois, measuring over 15 acres of land.

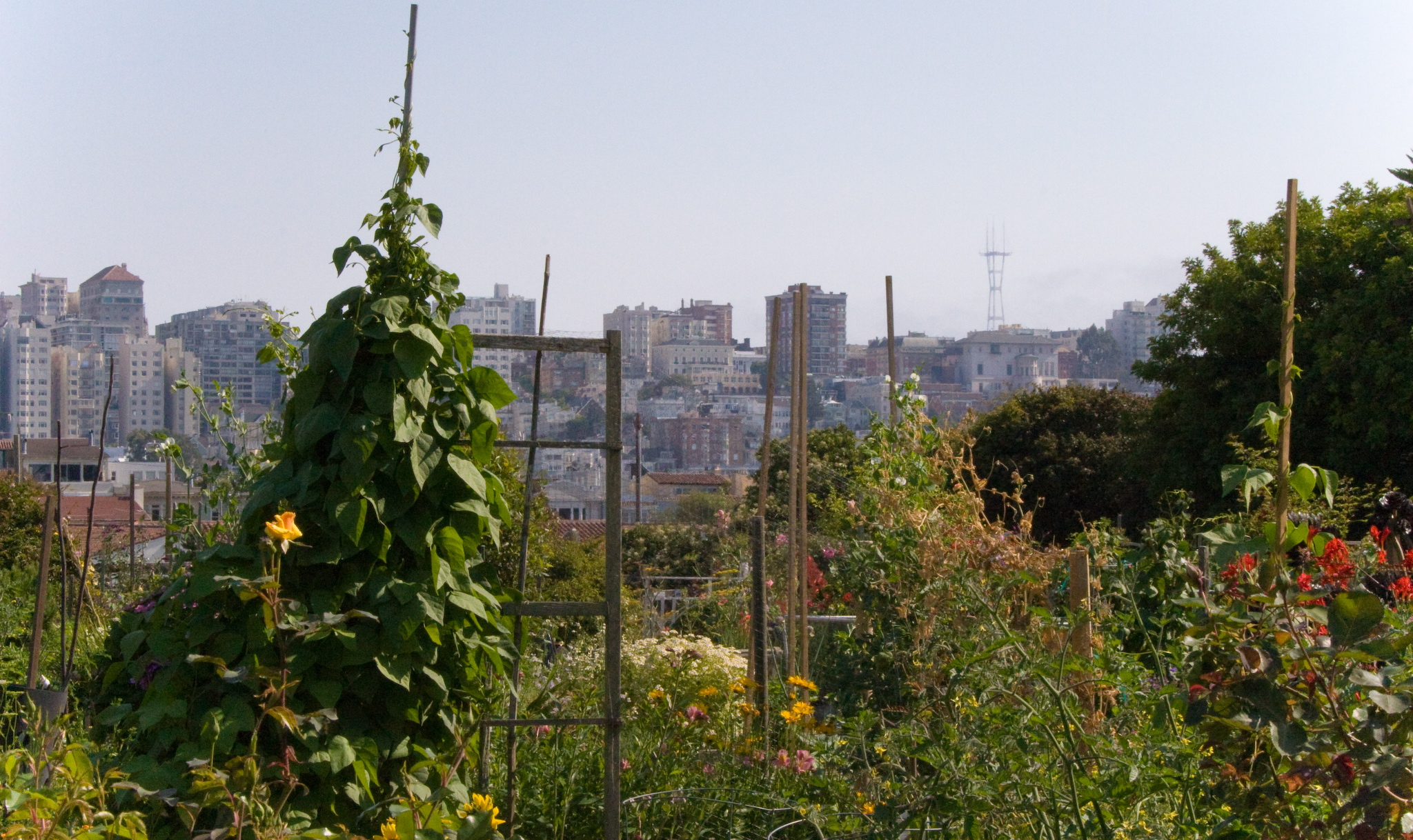
Fort Mason Community Garden, San Francisco, 2008

=== California ===
Altadena

In January 2025, the Eaton Fire devastated the Altadena Community Garden, destroying nearly all planting beds, toolsheds, and infrastructure. Founded in the 1970s on a former Mount Lowe Military Academy site, the garden had been a vital space for food justice, education, and intergenerational community-building. Only a few fruit trees survived. Despite the loss, local gardeners and volunteers began immediate efforts to restore the space, viewing its regrowth as a symbol of Altadena's resilience and commitment to sustainability and neighborhood recovery.

Los Angeles

As of the year 2020, there are over 125 community gardens in Los Angeles County. The Los Angeles Community Garden Council maintains resources and a website for people to locate gardens. These gardens consist of traditional community gardens where people rent a plot to grow their own fresh produce; educational gardens for teaching gardening, landscaping, nutrition and cooking; and urban farms where volunteers grow vegetables for local markets and people in need.

San Francisco Bay Area

In San Francisco, community gardens are available through various public and private entities. Most community gardens in San Francisco are available through its Recreation and Park Department, which manages over 35 community gardens on city property. These are allotment gardens whereby individuals or groups volunteer to be assigned garden plots. Garden members within their respective gardens democratically organize themselves to set bylaws that are consistent with city policy. These gardeners often self-impose garden dues as a membership requirement to cover common expenses. To standardize the development and management of its community gardens, the Recreation and Park Commission adopted its Community Garden Policy in 2006.

Though not plot-based, the city's Department of Public Works supports communal-style gardening on city property whereby community groups participate in the development and maintenance of public gardens. No one person is responsible for any portion of the site. One group, the Quesada Gardens Initiative, a community-based and resident-led volunteer group in an underserved neighborhood called Bayview Hunters Point, has created an enclosed food-producing garden on city-owned land, as well as developed many residential urban farms around privately owned homes.

All of the community gardens of San Francisco are listed on the San Francisco Garden Resource Organization web site with detailed directions and garden pictures of some of the gardens.

On the East side of the Bay, urban agriculture has become prominent in addressing food insecurity and accessibility to agricultural education. School programs, community farms, and more make up over 120 urban farms across East Bay cities. The City of Oakland has progressively invested in community gardens by revising zoning and land use policies to allow easier establishment of community farms. In addition to support from the City, universities also partner with community organizations (e.g. University of California, Berkeley, Gill Tract Community Farm).

=== Colorado ===
Denver

There are over 100 community gardens in the Denver metro area. Gardens are located on vacant land (42%), school grounds (26%), housing facilities (15%), and other locations (17%) such as churches and senior centers. Based on land tenure, community gardens in Denver are found on public land (52%), private land (24%), or owned by non-profits (16%) and Denver Urban Gardens (8%). Denver Urban Gardens (DUG) is a non-profit organization that assists community members with the design, planning, and construction of neighborhood community gardens. The majority of DUG's community gardens are located in low-to-moderate income areas, and more than 20 are located at Denver public schools. DUG also partners with government and other non-profit agencies to offer gardening and nutrition education.

In 2010, the Westwood community partnered with the non-profit Re:Vision to create a system of community gardens to increase healthy food access. As of 2015, they planned to expand the initiative and open a food cooperative in the neighborhood.

Aurora

The Aurora Mental Health Center, located in Aurora, Colorado, started a community garden in the eastern Aurora area in 2014 to improve community relations. The Aurora Mental Health Center Community Garden allows for community members to become garden leaders, helping newer members grow their plants, and provides individual horticulture therapy practices.

=== Illinois ===
Northern Illinois

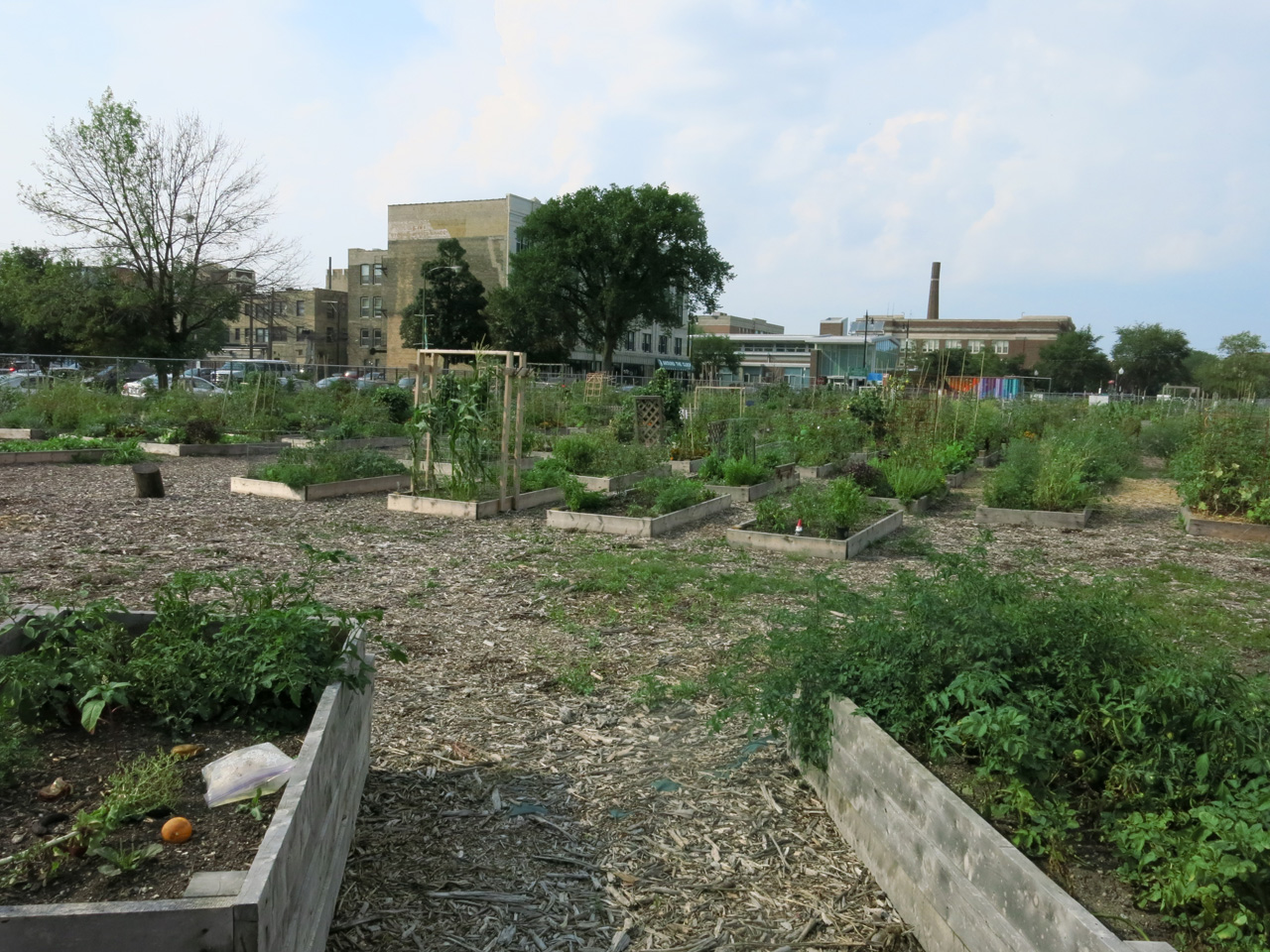
Rogers Park Community Garden, Chicago, Illinois

Over 900 community gardens exist in Northern Illinois, which includes the northernmost twenty-four counties including Cook, DuPage, DeKalb, and Rock Island counties. Cook County includes the City of Chicago where the Chicago Urban Agriculture Mapping Project (CUAMP), through city ordinance, documents community gardens and gardens that are actively food composting. Since the inception of the CUAMP in 2010, over 800 local gardens were recorded, with 109 of the gardens participating in food composting.

As part of the Cool Counties Initiatives to reduce greenhouse gases by 20% by 2030, DuPage County is promoting community gardens through collaboration with several organizations including The GardenWorks Project, a non-profit organization focused on reducing food insecurity by promoting community gardens and home gardens through education and empowerment. Located in DeKalb County, the DeKalb County Community Gardens was started by Dan Kenney in 2012 to overcome food insecurity, and offers access to over 15 acres of garden growing area. The Community Garden Program offered through the City of Rock Island Economic Community Development leases city owned land within twenty-five sites for $50-$70 per year for community gardens. Over ten tons of food exceeding $64,000 was produced in 2018 through this program. Local libraries are contributing to community gardens in Illinois as well.

Central Illinois

Although most counties in Central Illinois have an agriculture-based economy with common crops of corn and soybeans, this has not prevented community gardens from developing. When Marty Travis and his family purchased Livingston County's oldest farm, Spence Farm, in 2005, they founded the non-profit Spence Farm Foundation to promote education and overcome food insecurity. Over 700 pounds of produce were donated to local churches and pantries in 2015. The University of Illinois Extension supports community gardens with education programs facilitated by master gardener volunteers at various locations, including Carl Sandburg College Community Garden in Galesburg. Springfield is the state capital of Illinois and home to the University of Illinois Springfield. Since it began as a student group project in 2016, the UIS Community Garden and its volunteers have contributed over 600 pounds of produce to the local community. In Champaign County, community gardens are gaining popularity with community groups promoting community garden opportunities and education. Other communities are following suit by encouraging community gardens in their area, including Harvard, Bloomington, and Morton.

Southern Illinois

Southern Illinois has the longest growing season in the state, with as much as two weeks of growing before and after Central Illinois. Similar to other regions of Illinois, the University of Illinois Extension offers education and other resources like the planting grid for community gardens and gardeners in Southern Illinois. Carbondale has a number of community gardens, including the Red Hen Community Garden that hosted the Women of Change Big Event on September 19, 2020. Seeds and fresh produce were handed out to attendees of the event. In May 2020, the Men of Power-Women of Strength group in Cairo created a community garden at Cairo High School where students will have the opportunity to learn agriculture and gardening skills.

=== Indiana ===
Jasper County

Community garden guides and education resources for Jasper County and Indiana are available through the Purdue University Extension.

Marion County

IndyGrown in partnership with the Purdue University Extension created an interactive map featuring community gardens in the Indianapolis area.

Vigo County

Over 3500 pounds of produce were donated in 2020 by the ISU Community Garden in Terre Haute, Indiana. Since inception in 2008, the community garden has grown to over 160 plots available to the community.

=== Kentucky ===
Covington

Redden Gardens is a non-profit organization intended for vegetable gardening and community knowledge sharing while also promoting sustainable practices. In addition to their main garden in the Eastside neighborhood, they have participated in the creation of a community garden in the MainStrasse Neighborhood and a heritage garden in Devou Park.

=== Massachusetts ===
Boston

In the city of Boston, Massachusetts, there are a variety of local and non-profit organizations that own, promote, and manage approximately 180 community gardens throughout the city, with the largest non-profit organization being The Trustees with 56 community gardens totaling 15 acres under their management. In 2002, the volunteer-run Boston Community Garden Council was formed as a means of facilitating communication and cooperation between these organizations along with individual gardeners in Boston.

Arlington

Robbins Farm Garden is a cooperative community garden in Robbins Farm Park in Arlington, Massachusetts, roughly 2500 sf in size. The park is owned by the Town of Arlington and managed by Arlington's Park and Recreation Committee. The garden is managed cooperatively - that is, all member gardeners work in the entire space, rather than as individual allotments, and share the entire harvest. Decisions are generally made by consensus. Each gardener pays a small fee to the Town, which provides the space and water, and a small fee to the cooperative to pay for seeds, fertilizer, etc. Each gardener is expected to contribute a fair share of the gardening labor. An important function of the garden is to share gardening know-how between experienced and novice gardeners, which may help them manage their own home gardens. The garden web site also provides hyper-local guidance to local gardeners regarding scheduling, vegetable varieties, etc.

The Town of Arlington Recreation Department also operates a traditional community allotment garden in Magnolia Park, in which each gardener manages their own small plot.

=== Michigan ===
Detroit

The decline of Detroit's population since the 1950s has led to an increase in vacant land which has, in the 21st century, been utilized for urban agriculture as part of the planned revitalization of the city. Currently, Detroit is home to roughly 1,400 community gardens, including the Earthworks Farm, the North Cass Community Garden, and the Woodbridge Community Garden. Michigan Urban Farming Initiative, a nonprofit, has also introduced an agrihood which focuses on food insecurity for the surrounding community. Organizations like this have begun to transform Detroit from a destitute food desert to a thriving, food secure community .

=== Missouri ===
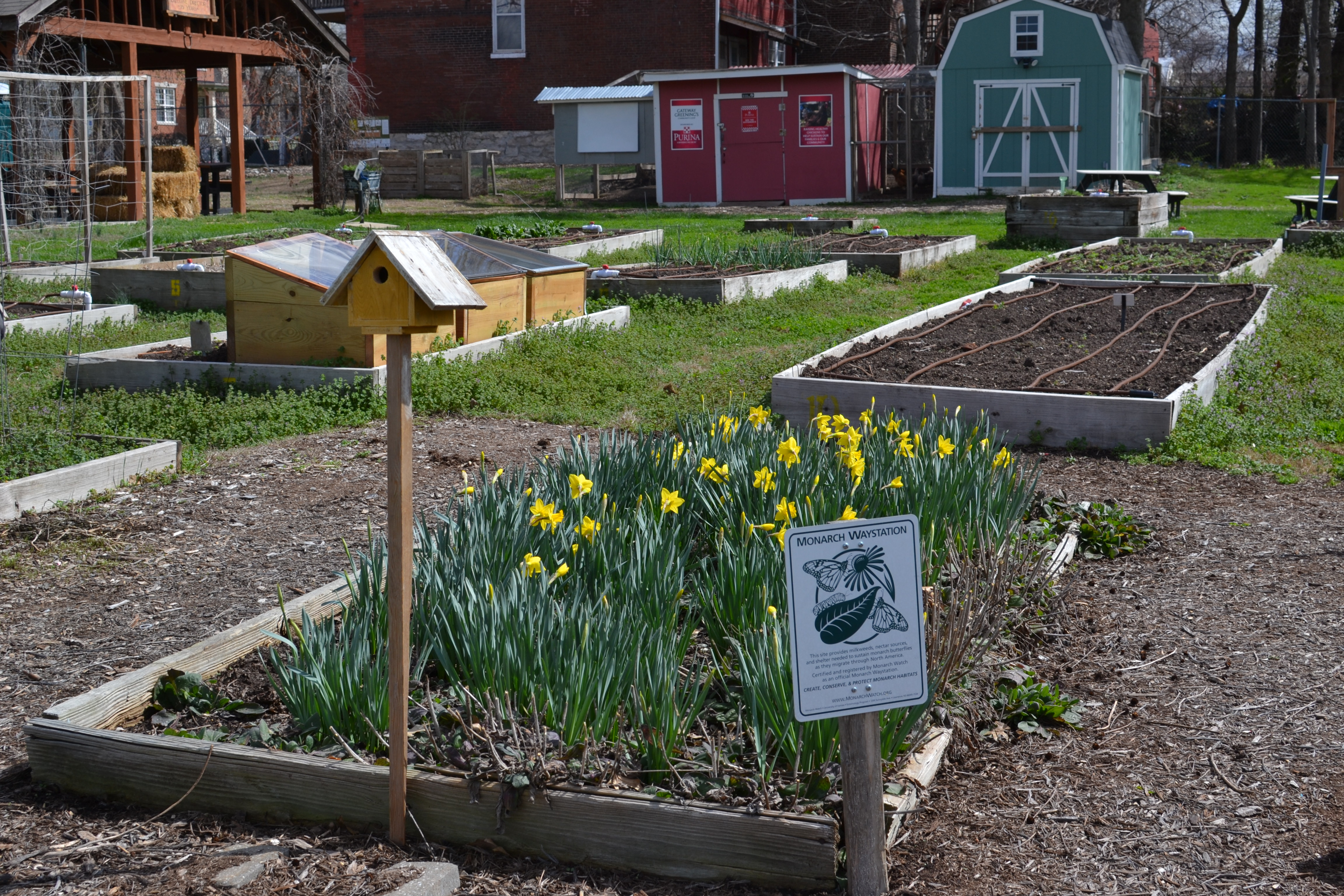
Bell Demonstration and Community Garden plays an integral role in Gateway Greening's ongoing community education efforts, with 20 demonstration beds, a community chicken coop, compost bins, extensive ornamental beds, and a sheltered outdoor classroom. This garden also houses additional beds which belong to the ever-active Bell Community Gardeners.

St. Louis is home to Gateway Greening, a unique non-profit organization that works with interested neighborhoods to transform vacant lots into vibrant community gardens. Since 1984, Gateway Greening has grown to support more than 250 community, school and youth gardens throughout St. Louis City and County. This support is provided through the creation of a grant processes which award much needed materials, tools, and other valuable resources to new and existing community gardens. Additionally, Gateway Greening provides community education opportunities at the Bell Community and Demonstration Garden, a network of Community Resource Gardens, and the Gateway Greening Urban Farm, a 2.5 acre urban farm located in downtown St. Louis.

Although Gateway Greening is a major proponent of community gardening in St. Louis, it is by no means the only group to create or support STL Urban Agriculture. Community gardening and urban agriculture has taken off in St. Louis, Missouri in the 2010s, in part thanks to the Garden Lease Program, which allows residents to lease LRA land for a period of 5 years.

=== New Jersey ===
Community gardens in New Jersey include the South Orange Community Garden.

=== New York ===
New York state has more than 3,000 urban and community gardens under its community gardens and urban agriculture initiative that is administered by the Department of Agriculture and Markets' Community Gardens Task Force.

There are over 550 community gardens on New York City property which are supported by GreenThumb (the community gardening division of NYC Parks), over 745 school gardens, over 100 gardens in land trusts, and over 700 gardens at public housing developments throughout New York City. Begun in 1978, GreenThumb is the largest and oldest program of its kind in the United States.

=== Oregon ===
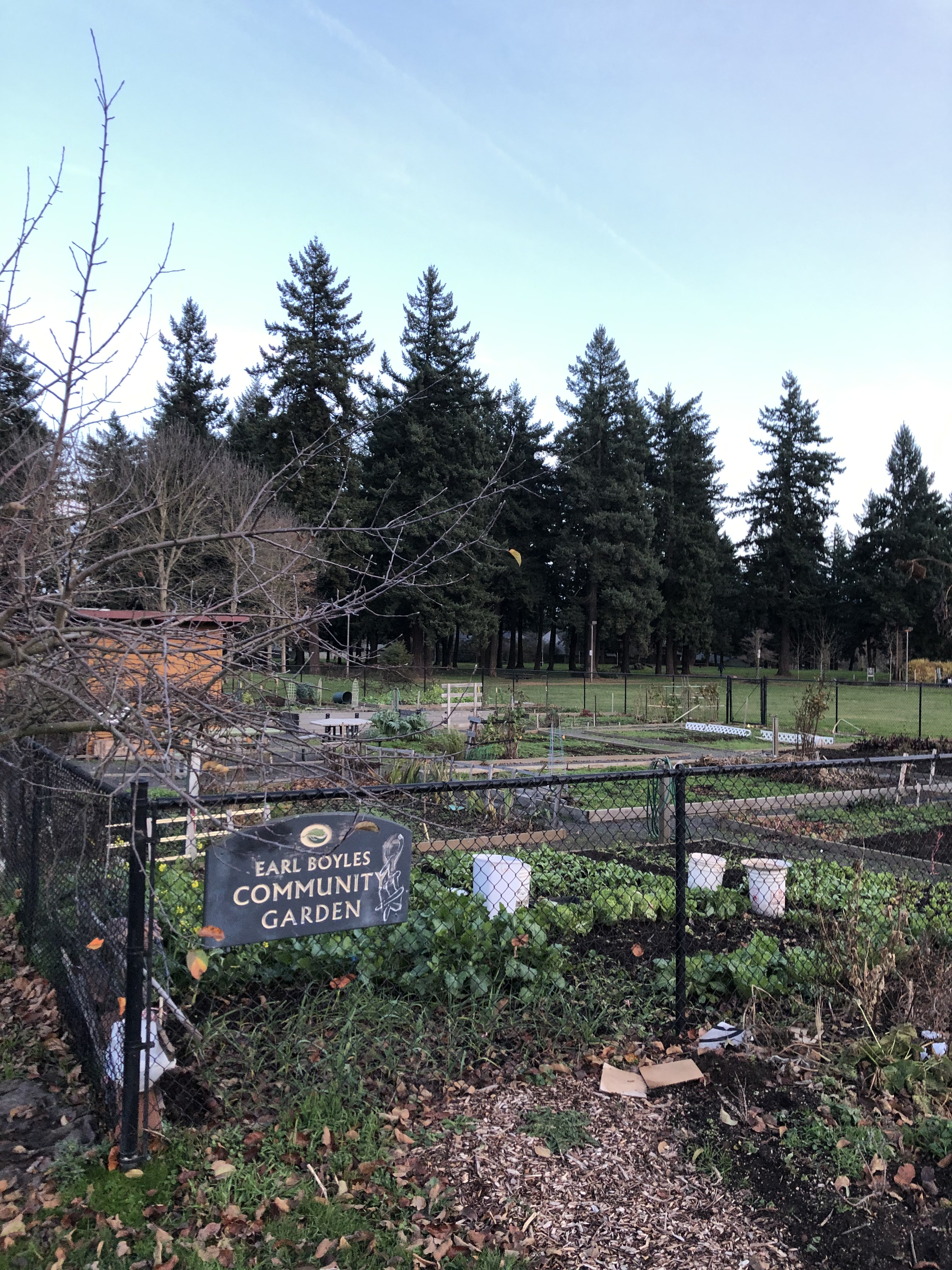
Earl Boyles Community Garden located in SE Portland

Portland

There has been an official community garden city program in Portland, Oregon since 1975. There are currently 57 active community gardens in the city. Organizations like The Portland Community Gardens Project and Food for Oregon have worked to provide residents with even more spaces to cultivate gardens. Since 2011, these organizations have aided the community in acquiring and cultivating garden plots. Other organizations such as Southeast Uplift have integrated community gardens as a part of the initiative to encourage community inclusiveness. The Brooklyn Community Garden was created in 2012 with the aid of the Brooklyn Action Corps Neighborhood Association and Southeast Uplift. Portland is also home to rain gardens that work alongside the community gardens. These rain gardens are planted to clean storm water runoff, as well as providing a place for pollinators such as bees.

=== Utah ===
Salt Lake City

In Salt Lake City, community gardens are available through the non-profit organization Wasatch Community Gardens. On May 16, 2009 Wasatch Community Gardens, in collaboration with The Redevelopment Agency of Salt Lake City (RAD), launched the first People's Portable Garden in Salt Lake City. The garden is designed to stimulate growth and revitalize different areas of the city. Salt Lake City put $48,000 into the People's Portable Garden. The People's Portable Garden is located at 900 S 200 W, Salt Lake City.

Provo has four locations where plots can be rented.

=== Washington ===
Seattle

The Seattle P-Patch program for community garden plots began in the early 70s during an economic downturn known locally as the "Boeing Bust" which had resulted in many people without work or money. Darlyn Rundberg Del Boca, a University of Washington student, saw an opportunity to promote children's gardening with a focus on growing for the local Neighbors in Need food bank program; with the help of a Seattle Councilmember, Del Boca obtained permission to use part of the Picardo family's truck garden in northeast Seattle with the City of Seattle renting the land for the cost of its real estate taxes. The first garden consisted of a large central garden plot planted by children from the nearby elementary school and their parents; families who volunteered to help were offered smaller individual plots around the perimeter of the central plot. The City subsequently purchased the Picardo farm, and the program of renting individual garden plots arising from the first efforts was named 'P-Patch' in honor of the Picardo family's contribution. The P-Patch program continued to grow and currently consists of 1900 plots in 68 locations with a total of 23 acres (93,000 m^{2}) of land, with additions planned each year, and the tradition of growing for local food banks resulted in 12.3 tons of food donated in 2008.

Olympia

In 2010 the city of Olympia adopted a plan to create up to six community gardens. Currently, the city has two gardens: one at Sunrise park and the Yauger Community Garden Project. There are also many private community gardens such Wendell Berry in the Bigelow neighborhood.

Tacoma

Tacoma is home to more than 43 community gardens, including 11 on City-owned property. Gardens are managed by Metro Parks, churches, community groups, schools and universities, and many other organizations.

== Image gallery ==
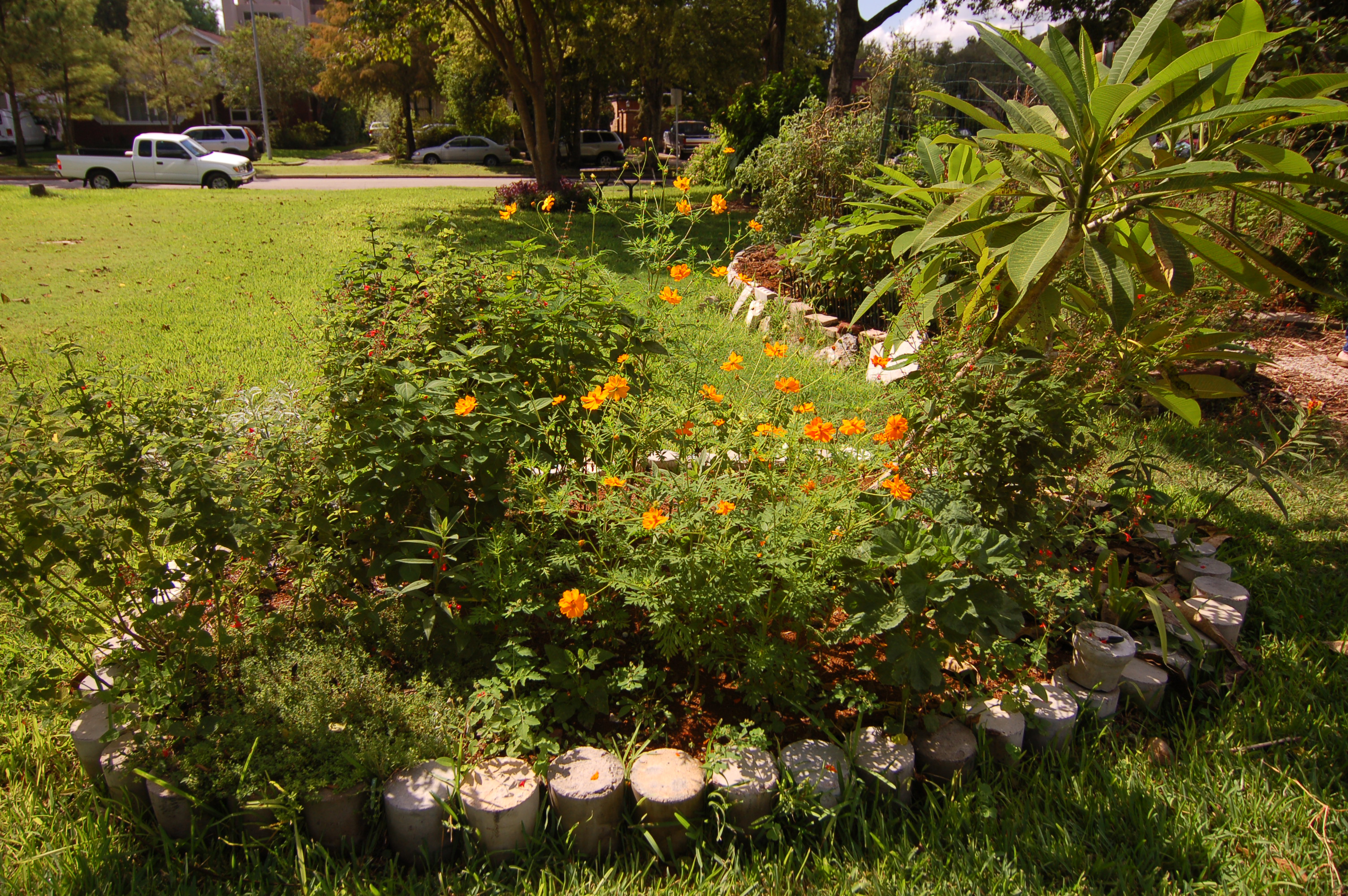
Meredith Gardens, Houston TX, 2005

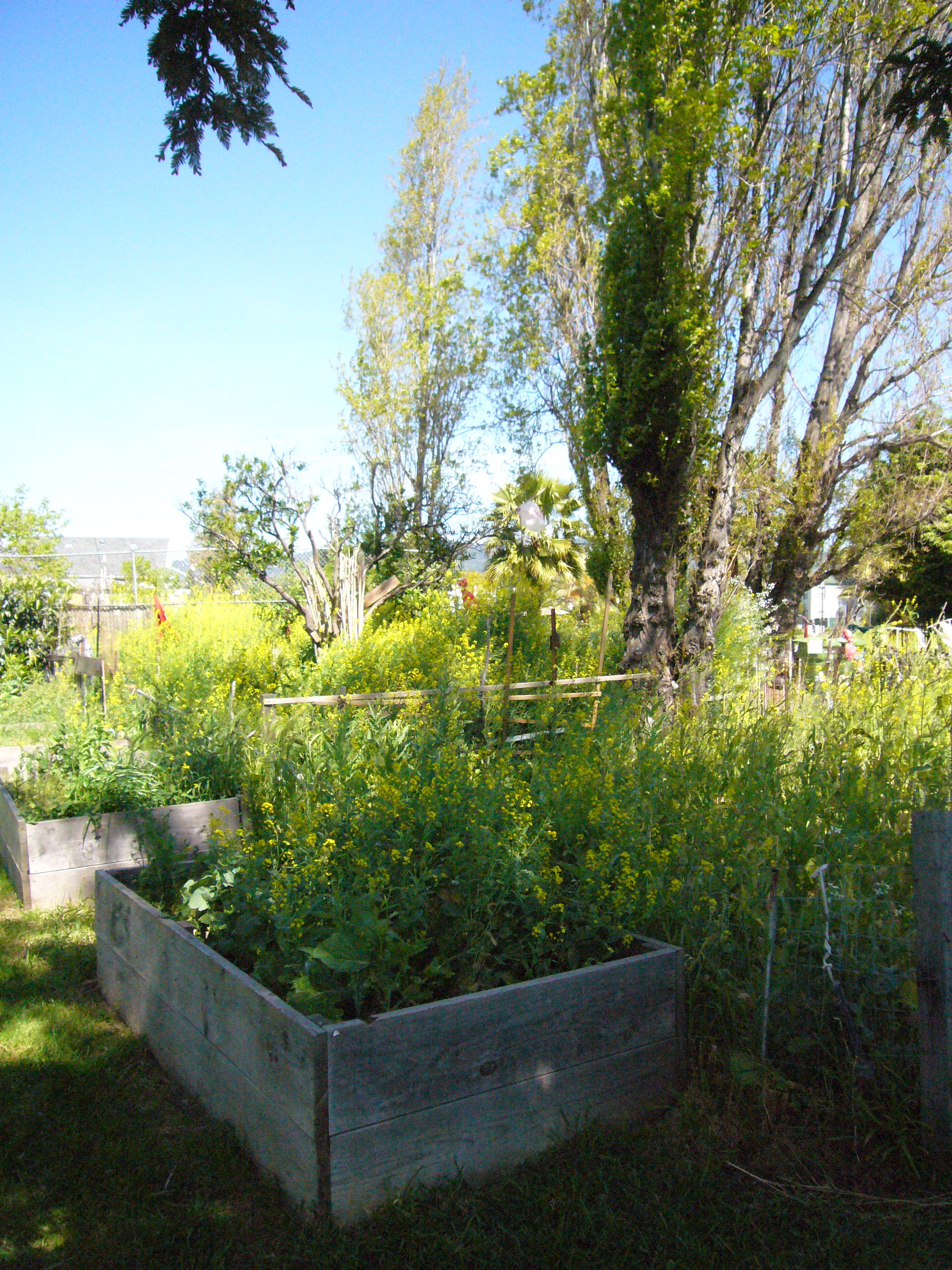
Peralta estate, Fruitvale, Oakland, California, 2007

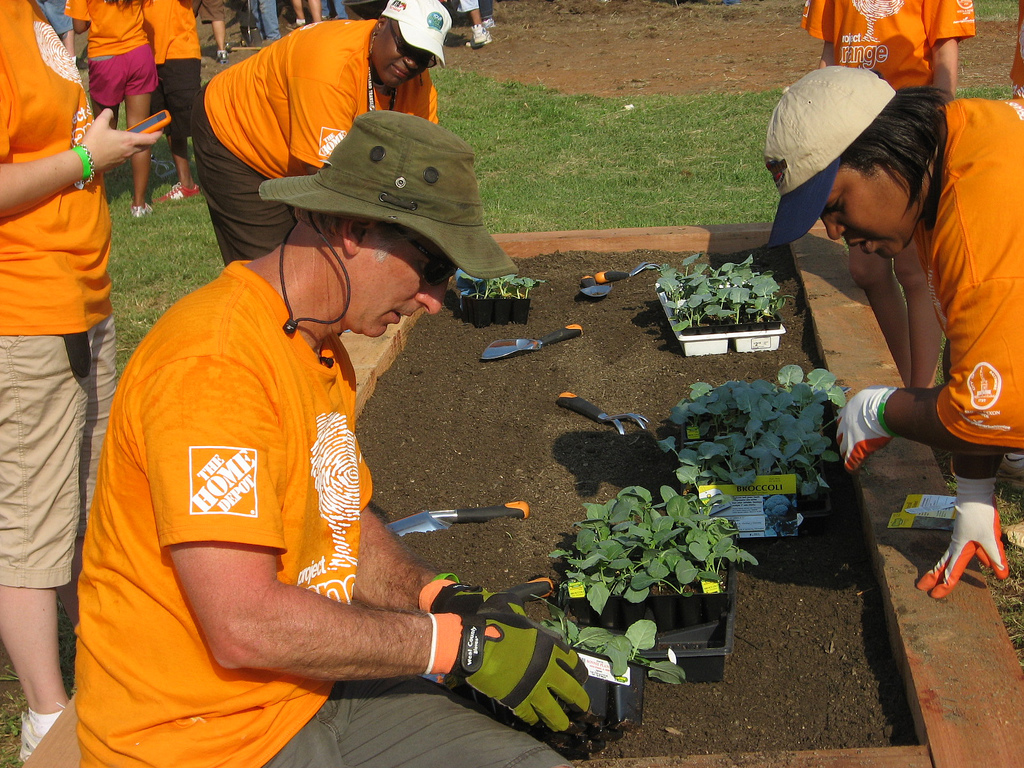
Oliver Garden, Baltimore, MD, 2008

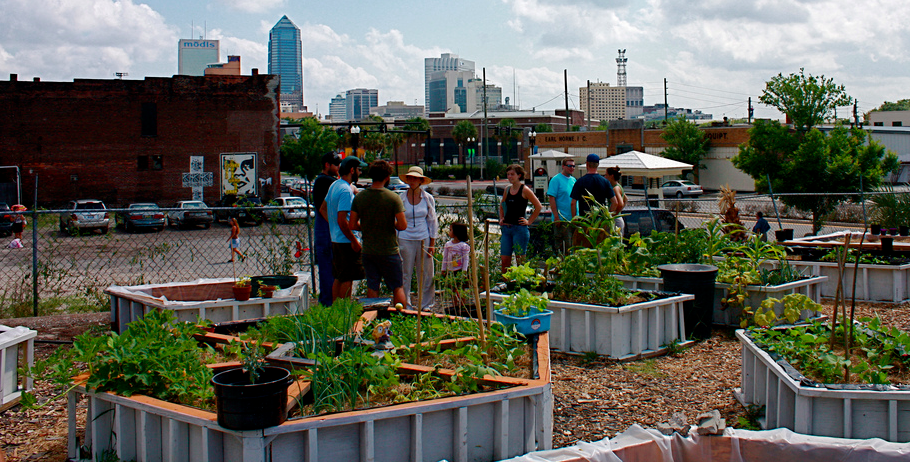
Springfield Community Garden, Jacksonville, Florida, 2008

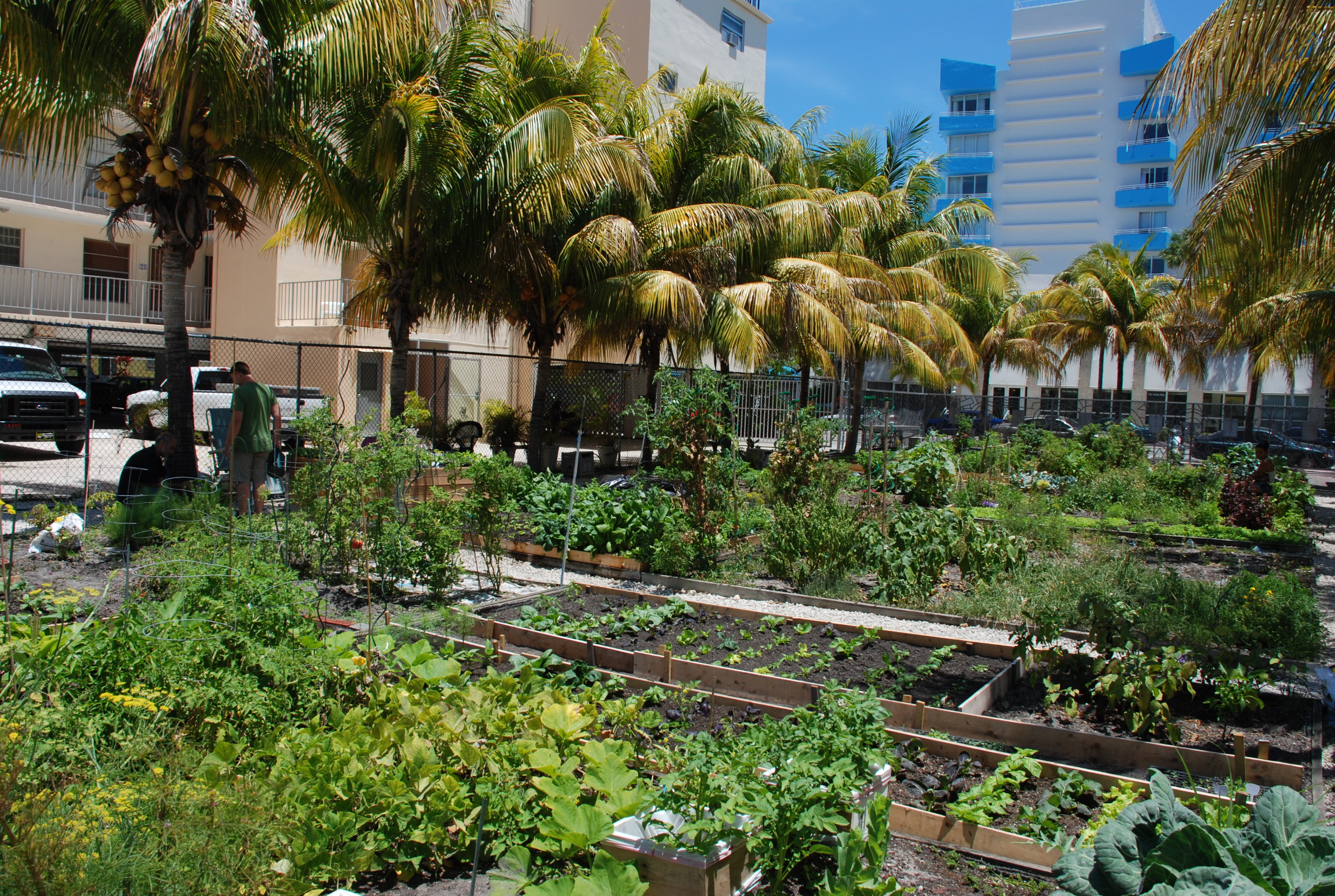
South Beach community garden, Miami, Florida, 2009

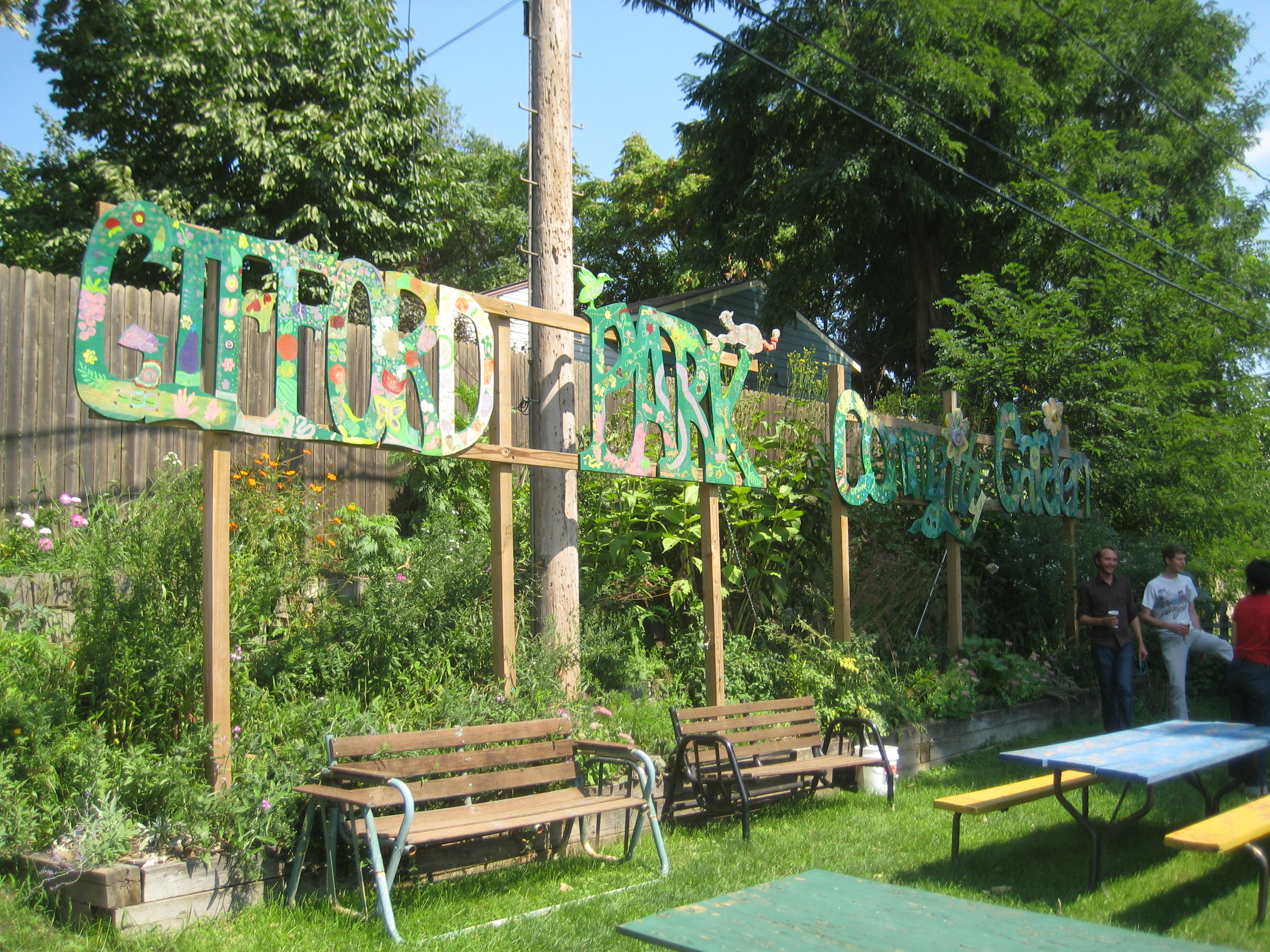
Gifford Park community garden, Omaha, Nebraska, 2009

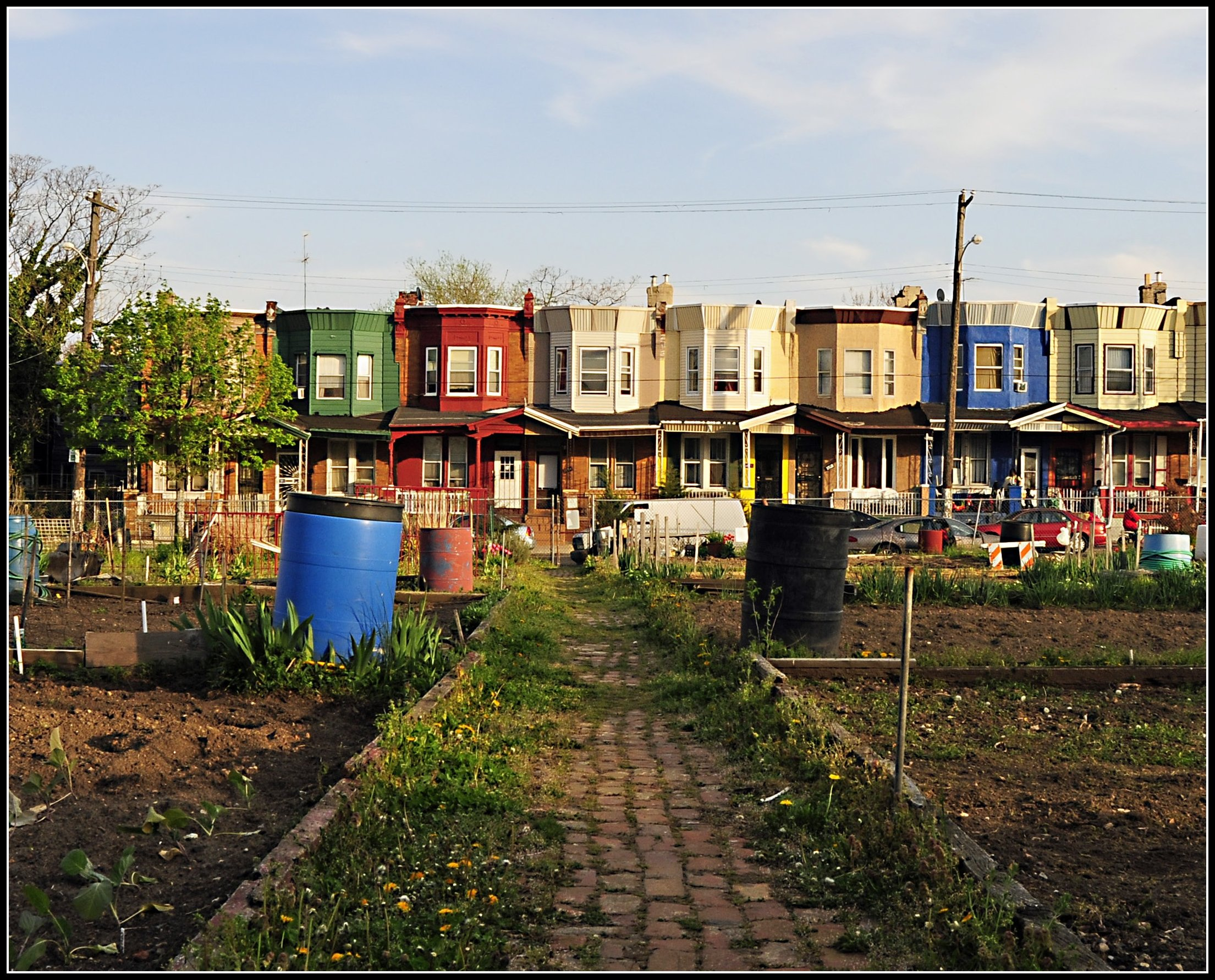
Glenwood Green Acres 18th Street & Glenwood Avenue, North Central Philadelphia, 2009

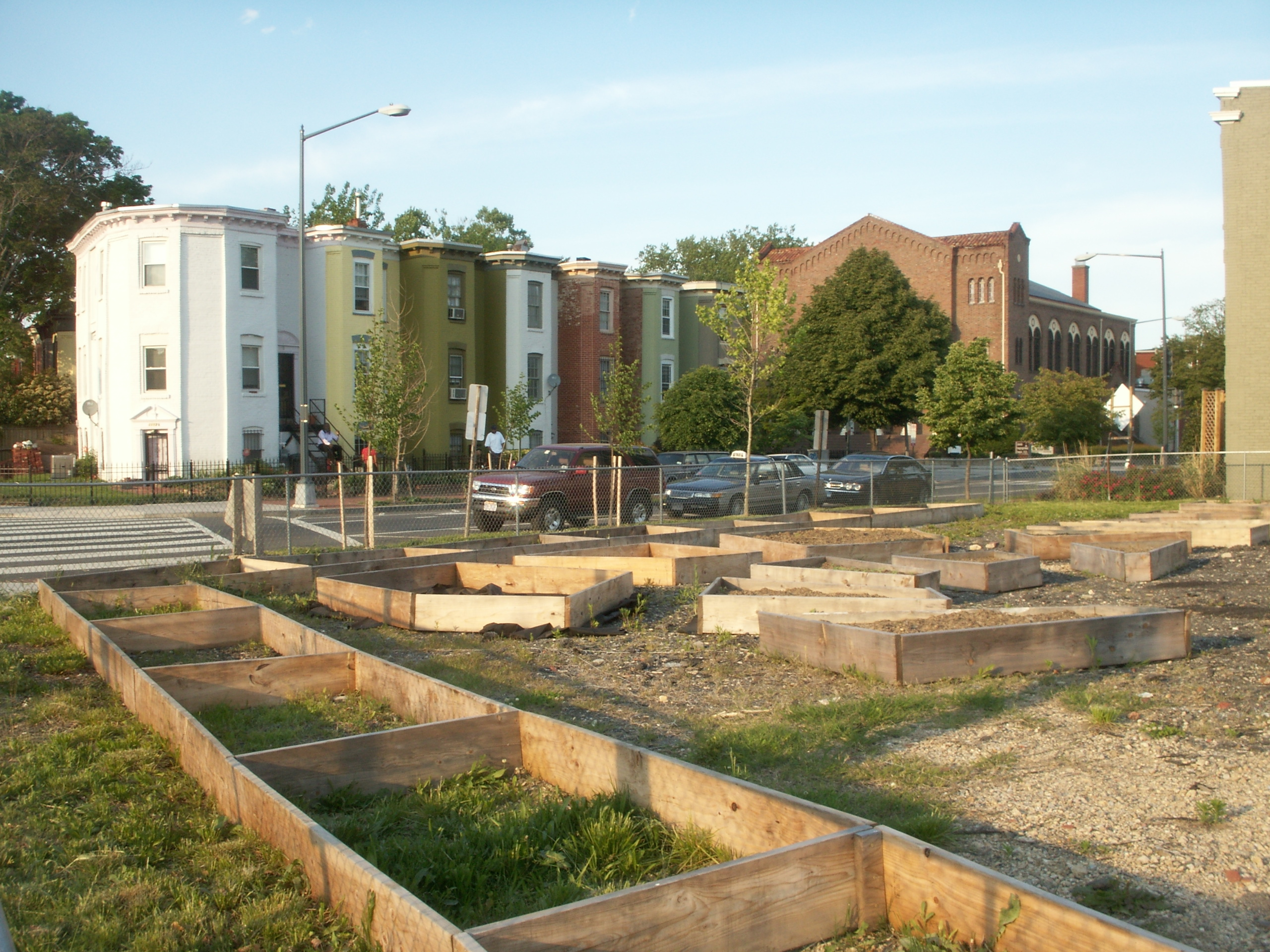
Fort Dupont Community Garden, Washington DC, 2010

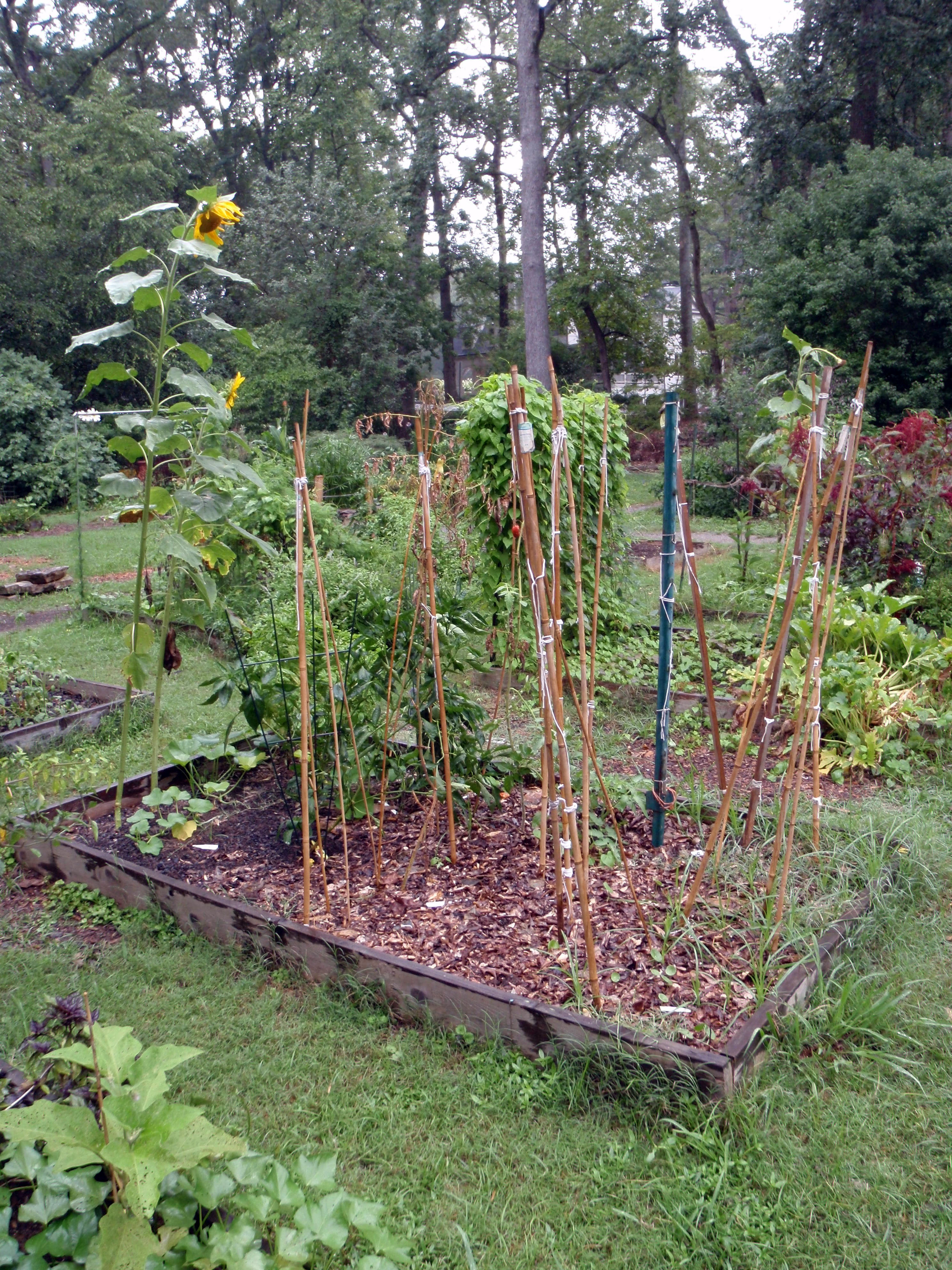
Oakhurst Community Garden, Atlanta GA, 2010

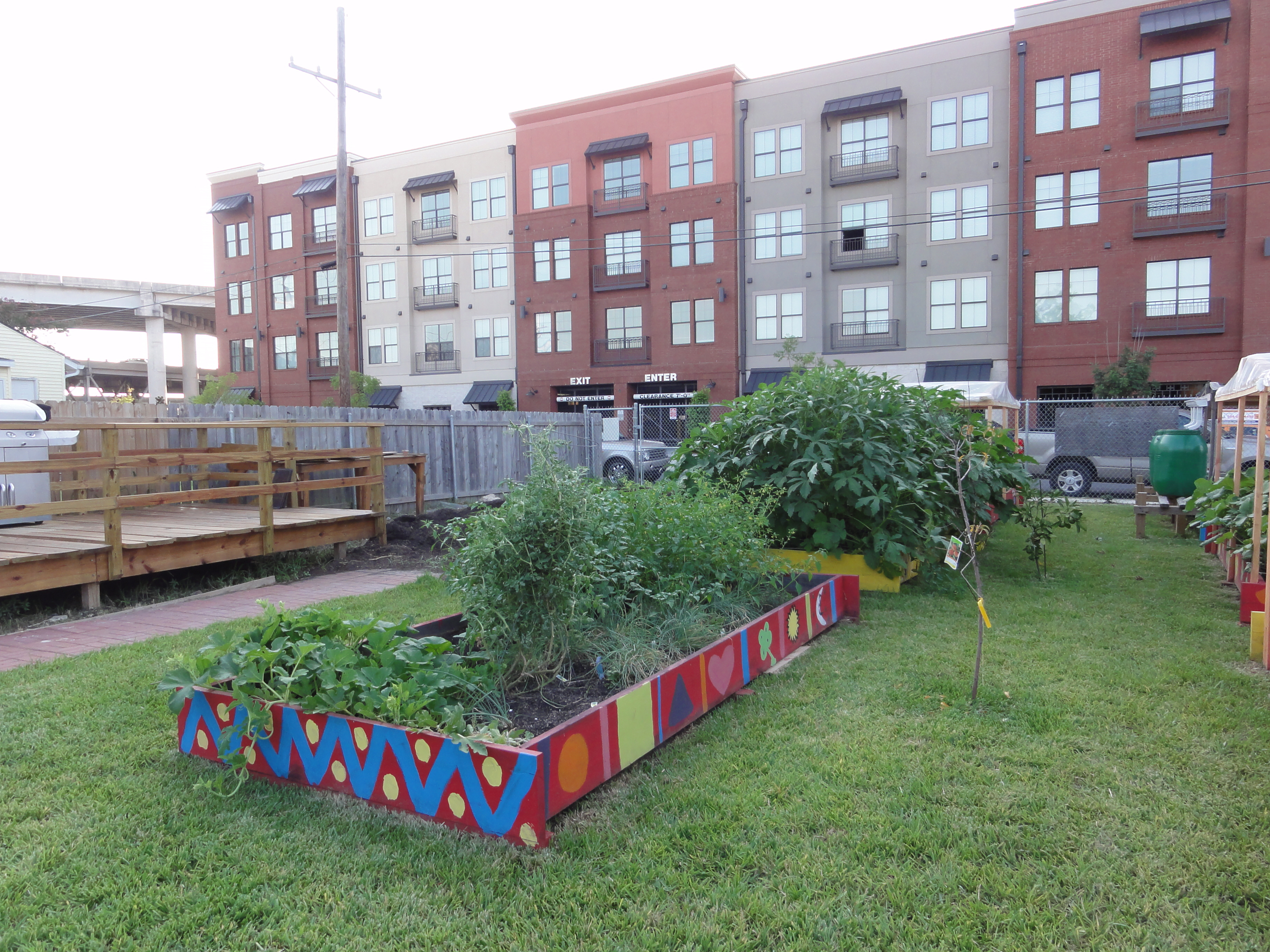
Wise Words Community Garden in Mid-City, New Orleans, 2010

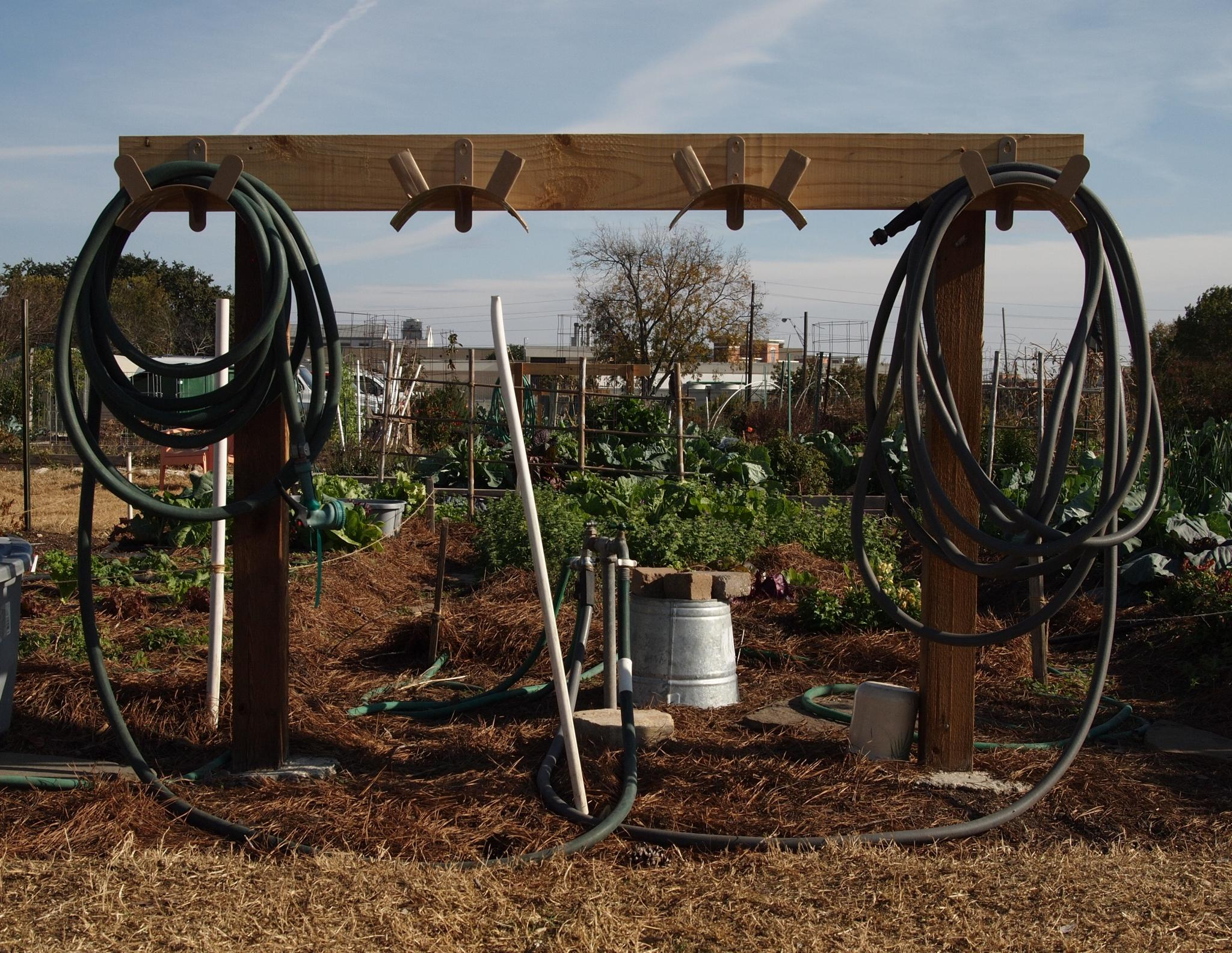
Austin, Texas, 2010

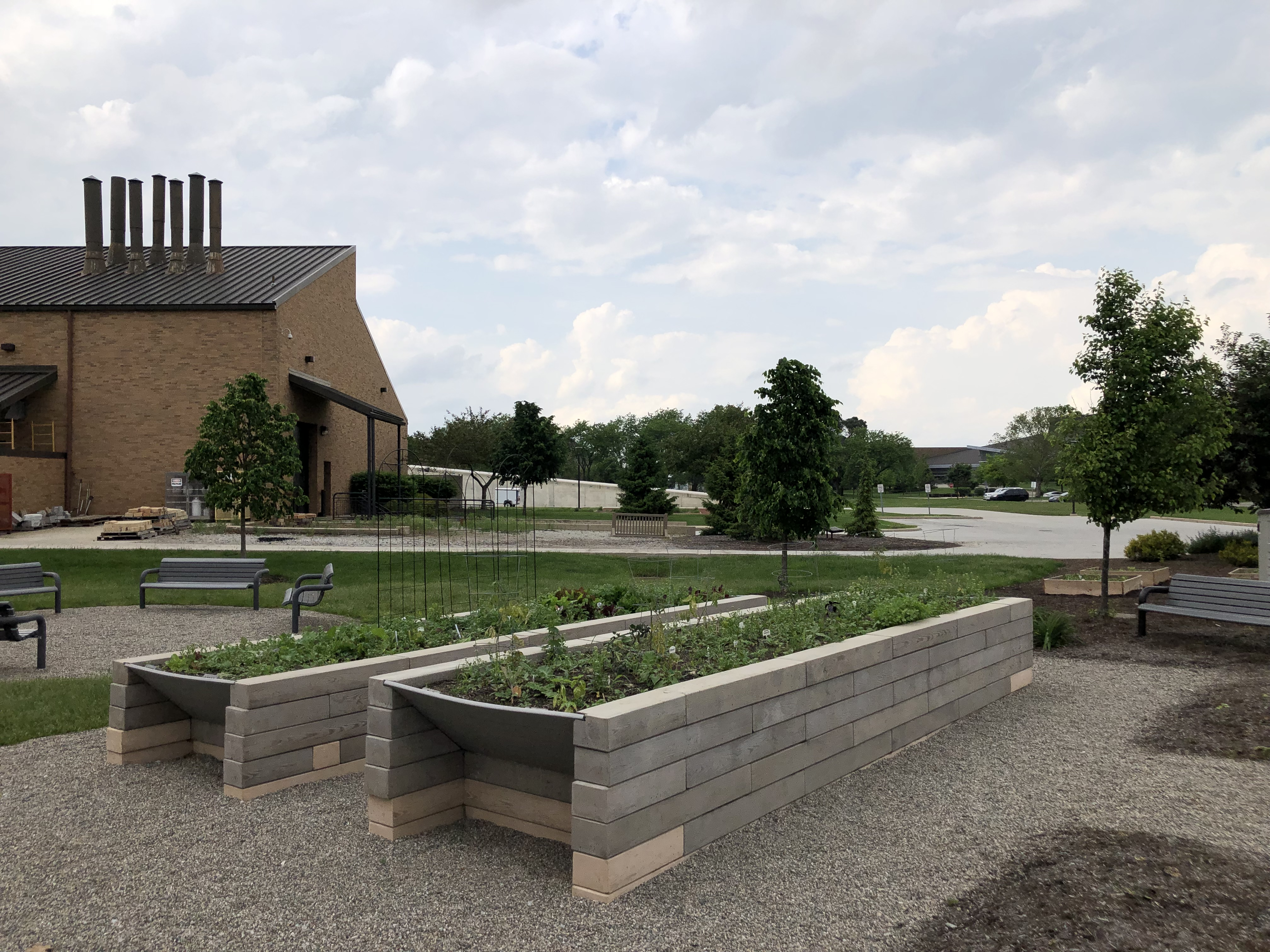
BGSU Community Garden, 2019

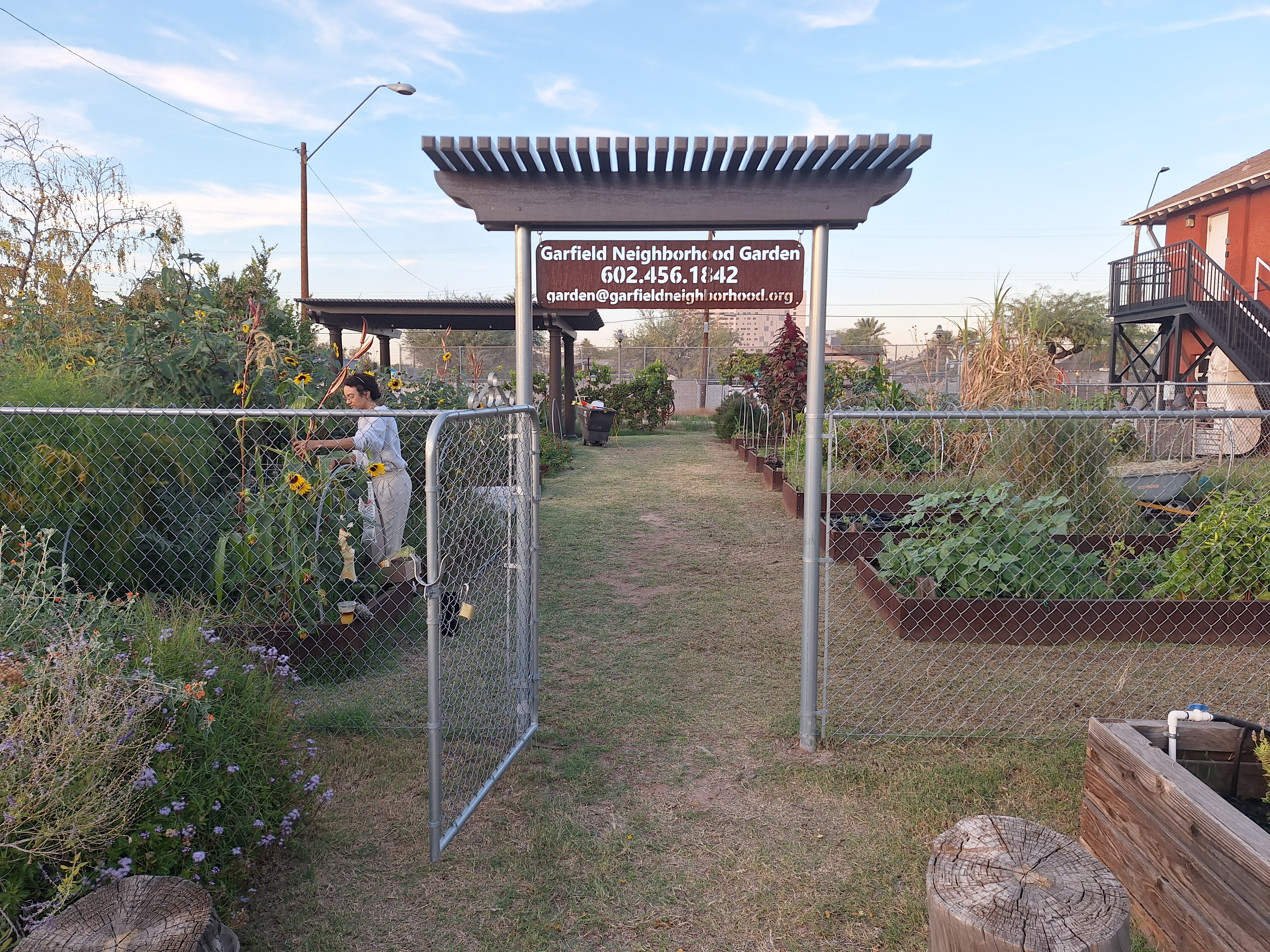
Garfield Neighborhood Garden in Phoenix, Arizona, 2025

== See also ==
- Allotment gardens
- American Community Gardening Association
- Commons
- Communal garden
- Community Food Security Coalition
- Community Supported Agriculture
- Garden sharing
- Guerrilla gardening
- Heirloom plant
- Intercultural Garden
- Seed swap
- Seedbank
- Urban gardening
- Urban horticulture
