= NACAA =

NACAA may refer to:

- National Association Of County Agricultural Agents (USA)
- National Australian Convention of Amateur Astronomers
- National Association of Clean Air Agencies (USA)
