= Garden sharing =

Garden sharing or urban horticulture sharing is a local food and urban farming arrangement where a landowner allows a gardener access to land, typically a front or back yard, in order to grow food.

This may be an informal, one-to-one relationship, but numerous Web-based projects exist to facilitate matchmaking. In some cases, garden sharing projects are launched as a way to shorten community garden waiting lists that are common in many cities.

== Organization ==
Garden sharing arrangements take two main forms. The simplest is an agreement between two parties: one supplies the land, the other supplies the labour, and the proceeds are shared. In larger collaborations, groups, often neighbours, share garden spaces, labour and the harvest.

The specifics addressed by a garden sharing agreement are potentially numerous, and the contract itself may be simple or exhaustive. Issues to be considered include terms of access, acceptable behavior, and who supplies what as far as gardening equipment and supplies. At one end of the scale, a verbal arrangement may be all that is expected. However, garden sharing organisations often suggest a written agreement and supply sample contracts. Organisers may also interview participants before suggesting a match.

== Garden sharing projects ==
The Web is frequently used as a platform for initiating garden sharing arrangements. Websites connecting landowners and growers are generally free and non-commercial. Websites are instituted by a variety of parties, including private individuals, government agencies, and non-profit groups.

=== North America ===
A number of local, regional and national programs exist across the U.S. and Canada, including:

- Yardsharing.org of Portland, Oregon, is a free online service devoted to connecting renters with landowners, with the goal of creating food for all. The website, created in 2007 by Joshua Patterson, resulted from a local media campaign to find relief for the Portland Community Gardens Program.
- Hyperlocavore.com is a free, U.S.-based international service that matches garden owners with gardeners, and facilitates the set-up of neighbourhood produce exchanges and other sharing projects.
- Alfrea.com was built to help landowners and gardeners connect. Think of it as your Marketplace for Land Sharing, Garden Services, and connecting you to Fresh Local food.
- SharingBackyards.com, run by a sustainability NPO in Victoria, British Columbia, was launched in 2006 by a volunteer at a community garden—the free programme is now in over 20 cities across North America.
- UrbanGardenShare.org, matching garden owners with gardeners, started in the Seattle, Washington (U.S. state) region, the result of a collaboration between an individual and a local sustainability group., and has grown to cover a number of cities in several states.
- SharedEarth.com is a website that connects people who have land, with people who want to garden or farm.

=== Europe ===
In the UK, Landshare is a high-profile national garden sharing project in England, spearheaded by celebrity chef and TV personality Hugh Fearnley-Whittingstall, in conjunction with public-service broadcaster Channel 4. Growers, landowners and volunteers can, at no charge, register their interest in participating in a share in their area. There are over 40,000 members. Although this is a number that have registered since 2009 when the social enterprise was first publicized widely, since then its activity has decreased. Scotland, has only one project, a charity called Edinburgh Garden Partners which has over 60 gardens throughout the city shared by volunteers. The charity aims to promote locally grown food and the skills of doing so with supporting older and disabled people who can no longer manage their garden. LendandTend Has been running since 2014. It offers a service to 'Patch-Match' garden Lenders who may not be able to manage their garden, with garden Tenders, people who wish to have garden space. Registration is free and some services to boost Lender or Tender visibility are payable. 50% of Lend and Tend profits are invested back in to the communities where garden-sharing activity is based.

In France, Prêter son jardin ("Garden lending") is a garden sharing web site started by a journalist in 2010.

=== Worldwide ===
Garden sharing projects are also incorporated into larger sustainability schemes. Transition Town Totnes (Totnes, England) and Transition Timaru (Timaru, NZ) have instituted garden sharing projects as part of their Transition Towns efforts to prepare communities on a local level for the effects of climate change and peak oil.

== See also ==
- Allotment (gardening)
- American Community Gardening Association
- Land use
- Landlord–tenant law
- Organic farming
- Sharecropping
