= Shiloh Field Community Garden =

Community garden in Texas

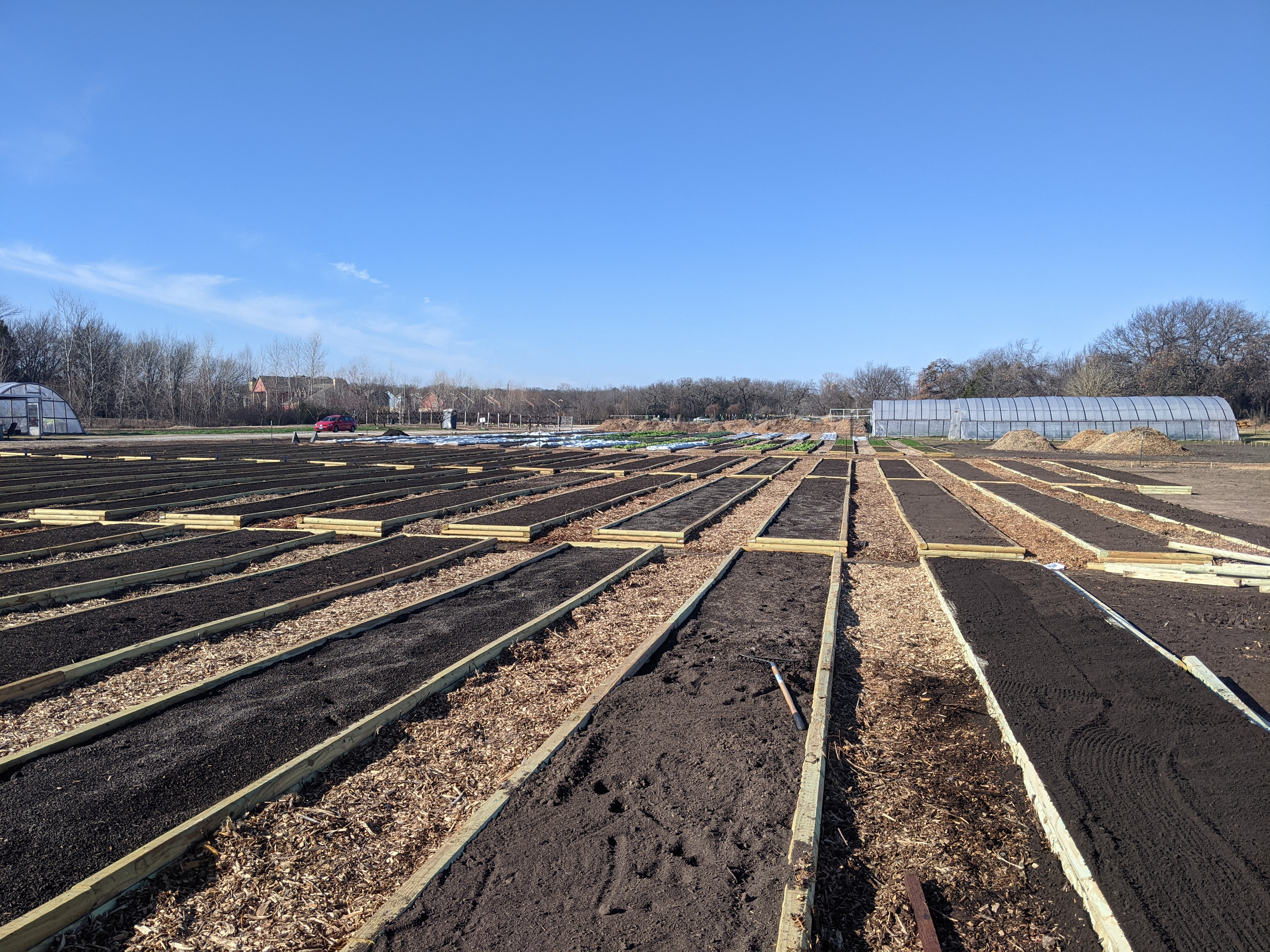
- Raised beds at Shiloh Field Community Garden, 2021

- Location within Texas
- Type: Community garden
- Location: Denton, Texas
- Coordinates: 33.230461°N 97.106235°W
- Area: 14.5 acres (5.9 ha)
- Created: 2009
- Founder: Gene Gumfory
- Owner: Friends of Shiloh Field Garden a 501(c) (3) organization
- Operator: Friends of Shiloh Field Garden
- Website: https://www.shilohfield.com/

Shiloh Field Community Garden is a community garden in Denton, Texas that grows produce for local food pantries and charities. At 14.5 acres, it is considered the largest community garden in the United States by the American Community Garden Association.

The garden was founded in 2009 by Gene Gumfory (1939–2020). The land is owned by the Denton Bible Church, but operations are funded through donations. In the first five years of operation, the garden harvested over 100,000 pounds of produce.

In 2019, Friends of Shiloh Field Garden (a 501(c)3 non-profit) was created to manage the daily activities and donations needed to run the garden. In 2019, the garden donated 23,000 pounds of fruits and vegetables. In response to the COVID-19 pandemic, the garden saw an increase in demand, and Friends of Shiloh Field Garden organized ways to optimize output. As a result, in the year 2020 alone, the garden donated over 40,000 pounds of produce to local food banks and nonprofits.
