= Community Food Projects =

Community Food Projects is a program administered by the Cooperative State Research, Education and Extension Service providing one-time matching grants to private non-profit entities to establish and carry out multi-purpose projects designed to increase food security on a local, community-based level. Project objectives are to meet the needs of low-income people by increasing their access to fresher, more nutritious food supplies; to increase the self-reliance of communities in providing for their own food needs; and to promote comprehensive responses to local food, farm, and nutrition issues. Congress has provided from $1 million to $2.5 million annually for the program in recent years, which USDA has used to make grants ranging from $10,000 to $250,000 each.

== See also ==
- Community gardens in Nebraska
