= Agricultural literacy =

Knowledge and understanding of agriculture

Agricultural literacy refers to a person's ability to understand, evaluate, and communicate basic information about agriculture. Agricultural literacy concerns one's level of knowledge and understanding of topics such as agriculture's relationship with the environment and natural resources, the production and processing of agricultural products, public policy in agriculture, and the social and economic consequences of agriculture.

== Definition ==
There is no one single accepted definition of agricultural literacy, and many organizations have developed their own definitions of the term. The National Research Council (NRC) defines agricultural literacy as "an understanding of the food and fiber system [that] includes its history and current economic, social, and environmental significance to all Americans." Agricultural literacy has also been described more simply as "having knowledge and competency in agriculture."

The definition and conceptualizations of agricultural literacy varies between differing groups. Many associate agricultural literacy with working with youth in Agriculture in the Classroom and 4-H settings. Others have a broader view of agricultural literacy and include adult education. The content of agricultural literacy can also vary in scope. Some may view the content very narrowly as centering on just agriculture. Others may describe agricultural literacy as including fields such as food, health, environment, food production which is related or connected to agriculture. When viewed from a broad perspective, agricultural literacy happens in a multitude of settings. Furthermore, many instructors who are conducting agricultural literacy programming would not even describe their work as agriculture literacy. Agricultural literacy in this broad sense has also increased in popularity dramatically in the United States as people have become more health and food conscious.

There are numerous citable definitions of agricultural literacy, including:

1. The committee envisions that an agriculturally literate person's understanding of the food and fiber system includes its history and current economic, social, and environmental significance to all Americans. This definition encompasses some knowledge of food and fiber production, processing, and domesticating and international marketing…. Achieving the goal of agricultural literacy will produce informed citizens able to participate in establishing the policies that will support a competitive agricultural industry in this country and abroad.
2. Agricultural literacy can be defined as possessing knowledge and understanding of our food and fiber system. An individual possessing such knowledge would be able to synthesize, analyze, and communicate basic information about agriculture. Basic agriculture information includes: the production of plant and animals products, the economic impact of agriculture, its societal significance, agriculture's important relationship with natural resources and the environment, the marketing of agricultural products, the processing of agricultural products, the public agricultural policies, the global significance of agriculture, and the distribution of agricultural products
3. "Agricultural literacy entails knowledge and understandings of agriculturally related scientific and technologically based concepts and processes required for personal decision making, participation in civic and cultural affairs, and economic productivity. At a minimum, if a person were literate about agriculture, food, fiber, and natural resources systems, he or she would be able to a) engage in social conversations, b) evaluate the validity of media, c) identify local, national, and international issues, and d) pose and evaluate arguments based on scientific evidence. Because agriculture is a unique culture, an understanding of beliefs and values inherent in agriculture should also be included in a definition of agricultural literacy so people can become engaged in the system."
4. Helping students read and respond to the agricultural world requires that we pose problems about where our food comes from and why; and about how we continue to be raced, gendered, faithed, and classed by agricultural policies, practices, and groups. In doing so, however, we must be prepared to help students read and respond critically to agricultural "words" as well, directing explicit attention to the powerful roles rhetoric plays in mediating our relationships to one another, farm owners, farm workers, farming communities, and food.

== University programs ==
Several universities (e.g., Texas Tech, the University of Arizona, Colorado State University, and California Polytechnic State University) sponsor agricultural literacy programs to promote the understanding and knowledge necessary to synthesize, analyze, and communicate basic information about agriculture with students, producers, consumers, and the public. These programs focus on assisting educators and others to effectively incorporate information about agriculture into subjects being taught or examined in public and private forums and to better understand the impact of agriculture on society.

== Conceptualization of agricultural literacy ==
There are number of educational terms which can be tied back, at least partially, to agricultural literacy. Some of these terms are straightforward programs while some terms are highly theoretical. Furthermore, some of the terms represent educational movements that can have a variety of different ideological purposes. Each term have at least one element which is shared with the definition(s) of agricultural literacy.

- Food Literacy
- Agri-food Literacy
- School Gardens
- Natural Resources Literacy
- Science, Technology, Engineering, and Mathematics (STEM) Literacy
- Agricultural Careers
- Animals and Plants in the Classroom
- Critical pedagogy in the Classroom
- Food Justice (Food security)
- EcoJustice or EcoPedagogy Ecopedagogy

== Role of agricultural values ==
The role of culture and identity is important in education. Issues of race, class, gender, and sexuality play an important part in work of agricultural literacy. Agricultural values also play an important part of agricultural literacy work, which is unique in the field of agricultural education. People have a wide variety views on agriculture and agricultural practices (see agrarianism). These values shape how an agricultural literacy instructor designs curriculum and works with clientele and how the clientele receives the messages of the instructor.
