= Gateway Greening =

The logo of Gateway Greening

Seed St. Louis (formerly'Gateway Greening") is non-profit organization based in St. Louis, Missouri that works to educate and empower the community through gardening and urban agriculture. The organization operates demonstration and community resource gardens, hosts lectures and education programs, and supports school and community gardens throughout the City and St Louis County, Missouri.

== History ==
Founded by Sue Reed and Kitty Hoblitzelle in 1983, Seed St. Louis began its life as an all-volunteer organization under the name Gateway to Gardening (GTG). These innovators noticed that in their surrounding neighborhoods more and more vacant lots seemed to be attracting unsavory activities. At the same time, food insecurity was a visible problem as entire communities were food insecure, lacking easy access to healthy, nutritious foods. Reed and Hoblitzelle were inspired to transform the vacant lots they saw into community gardens – a way to bring neighbors together in a shared space, building relationships and growing fresh produce.

Since 1983, Seed St. Louis has grown into an active non-profit with a full-time staff of 12, with an expanding network of over 200 school and community gardens across St. Louis City and County and a 2.5 acre urban farm in the heart of downtown St. Louis. Gateway Greening supports a robust community outreach and education program, made possible by a strong volunteer base.

=== Early history ===
Seed St. Louis received its 501(c)3 status in 1984, transitioning from an all-volunteer organization to a not-for-profit. Slowly it began to grow, hiring its first Executive Director Michael Adrio and program staffer in the early 1990s to meet the increasing demand for services.

Due to a rapidly growing number of requests from gardeners and neighborhood groups, Gateway to Gardening partnered with the Missouri Botanical Garden in an effort to reach and support as many people as possible. In 1997, GTG officially became affiliated with the Missouri Botanical Garden and the organization's name and logo changed to Gateway Greening, Inc. In 2021, the organization went through another rebranding and changed their name one final time to Seed St. Louis. Although Seed St. Louis separated from the Missouri Botanical Garden in 2012, the organizations continue to partner on individual projects today.

In the intervening years, the full-time staff has been supported by 3-4 part-time seasonal staffers, often augmented by AmeriCorps VISTAs, Interns, and a large and enthusiastic volunteer base. With their combined efforts, Seed St. Louis has built a number of programs and partnerships that have been successfully making a positive impact in St. Louis for over 40 years. Seed St. Louis' current mission is to educate and empower people to strengthen their communities through gardening and urban agriculture.

== Community gardens ==
Neighborhoods and community groups that are interested in forming a community garden or green space are coached through a careful planning process which requires all new garden groups to create a solid plan of action: ensuring that new gardens have legal rights to the land they use, support of their local politicians and key community members, access to necessary amenities such as water, and basic rules and guidelines for how the garden will function in place. In this way, Seed St. Louis works with existing organizations to develop garden projects with long term stability.

Gardens in the Seed St. Louis network have access to a number of benefits, the most visible of these is the expansion application in the spring and fall which allows gardens to apply for additional supplies such as raised beds, soil, garden tools, wheelbarrows, compost bins, and tool sheds. Other benefits including ongoing educational opportunities for gardeners at Gateway Greening's Bell Demonstration & Community Garden and the network's Community Resource Gardens, many of which are free and also open to the public.

=== Bell Demonstration & Community Garden ===
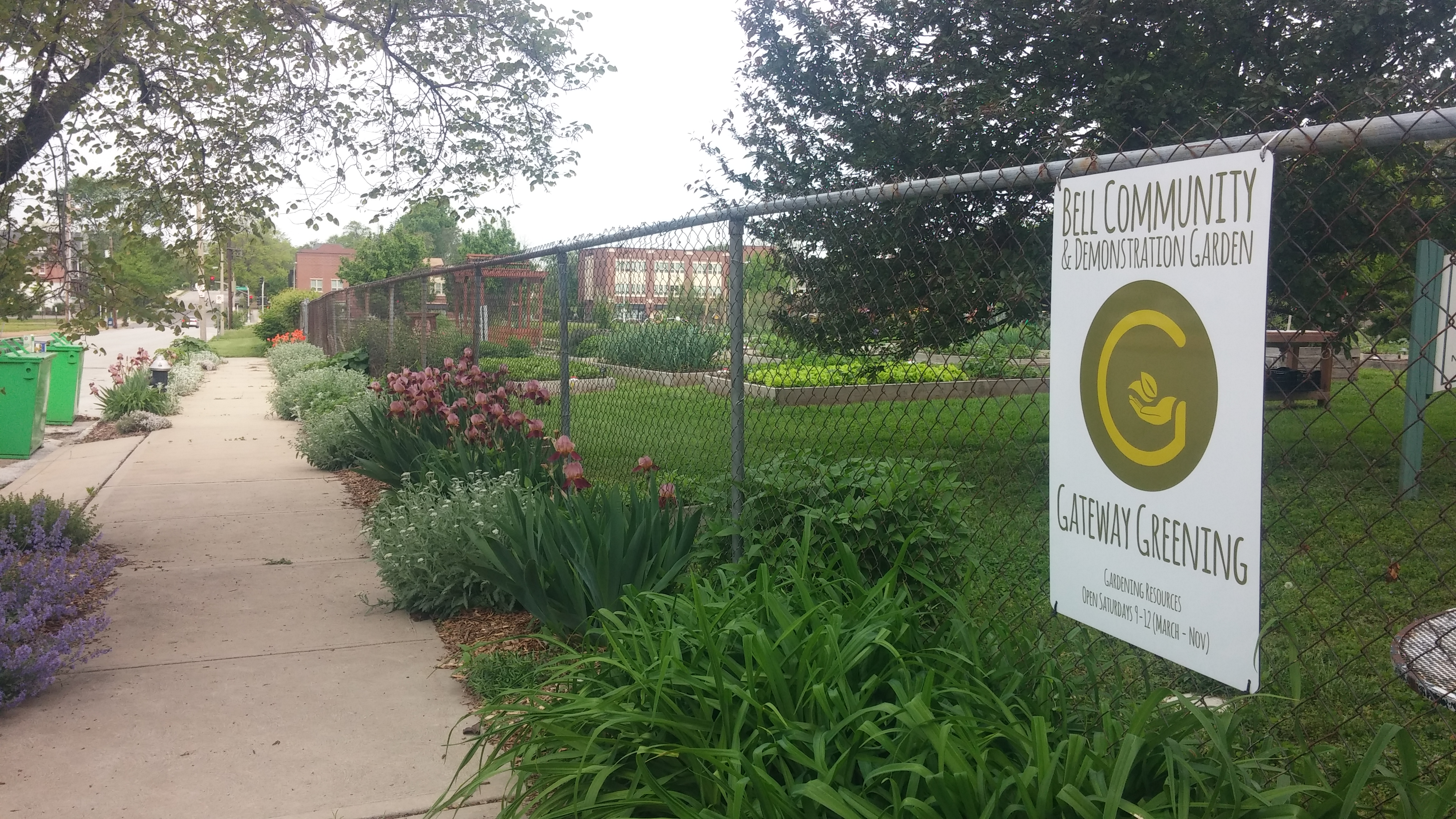
Bell Demonstration Garden

The Bell Demonstration & Community Garden is frequently referred to as Seed St. Louis' ‘outdoor office’ and serves as a thriving resource for urban gardening activities. It features a traditional community garden as well as 20 garden demonstration beds which are cared for by staff and volunteers, often serving as the backdrop for educational garden workshops and how-to video resources which can be found on the organization's YouTube channel. Bell is also home to The Carriage House, an indoor workshop and teaching space, and the PURINA Community Coop, a hands-on resource for St. Louis backyard chicken keepers and a source of fresh eggs that are donated to the coop's volunteers.

=== Community Resource Gardens ===
Community Resource Gardens are active community gardens that function as ‘helpful older siblings,’ providing resources and knowledge to smaller community and youth gardens throughout St. Louis. As of May 2016, The Gateway Greening network contained three hubs: 13th Street Community Garden (Old North St. Louis neighborhood), McPherson Community Garden (Skinker DeBaliviere neighborhood), and Wayside Community Garden (Normandy, Missouri).

=== Library gardens ===
In 2012, Seed St. Louis partnered with the St. Louis County Library District to begin establishing community gardens at public libraries, creating additional learning facilities and educational programming for patrons of all ages. Through the support of volunteers, local organizations, and community members, this partnership has led to the establishment of the Prairie Commons Community Garden (Prairie Commons Library Branch, Hazelwood, MO), the Cliff Cave Community Garden (Oakville, MO and Unincorporated St. Louis County), and the Grants View Community Garden (Unincorporated St. Louis County).

== School gardens and youth education ==
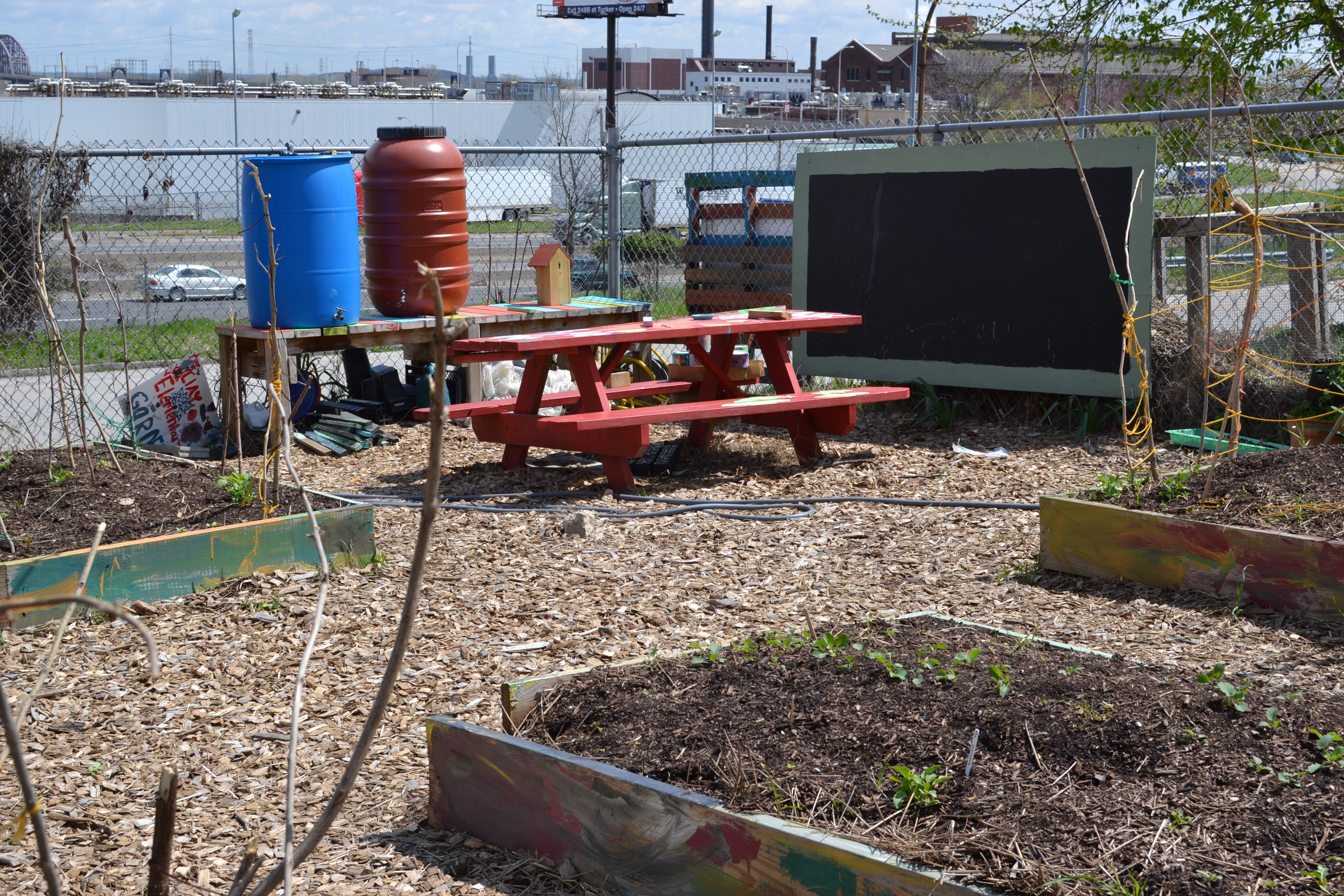
Clay Elementary's School Garden in St. Louis, Missouri 2016

Seed St. Louis currently supports approximately 90 school and youth gardens throughout St. Louis City and County.

Much like community gardens, youth gardens come in all different shapes, sizes, and styles, ranging from active vegetable gardens to sensory, native and butterfly gardens. Youth gardens create unique outdoor classrooms that are naturally equipped for students to explore diverse subjects like science, math, and health while tying into existing lessons in history, reading and writing.

In addition to assisting interested organizations in establishing gardens and providing ongoing materials and support for youth and school gardens, Seed St. Louis also offers educational programs that work directly with schools and other youth organizations to teach kids about gardening, agriculture, and healthy eating through hands-on outdoor lessons and activities.

== Gateway Greening Urban Farm (GGUF) ==
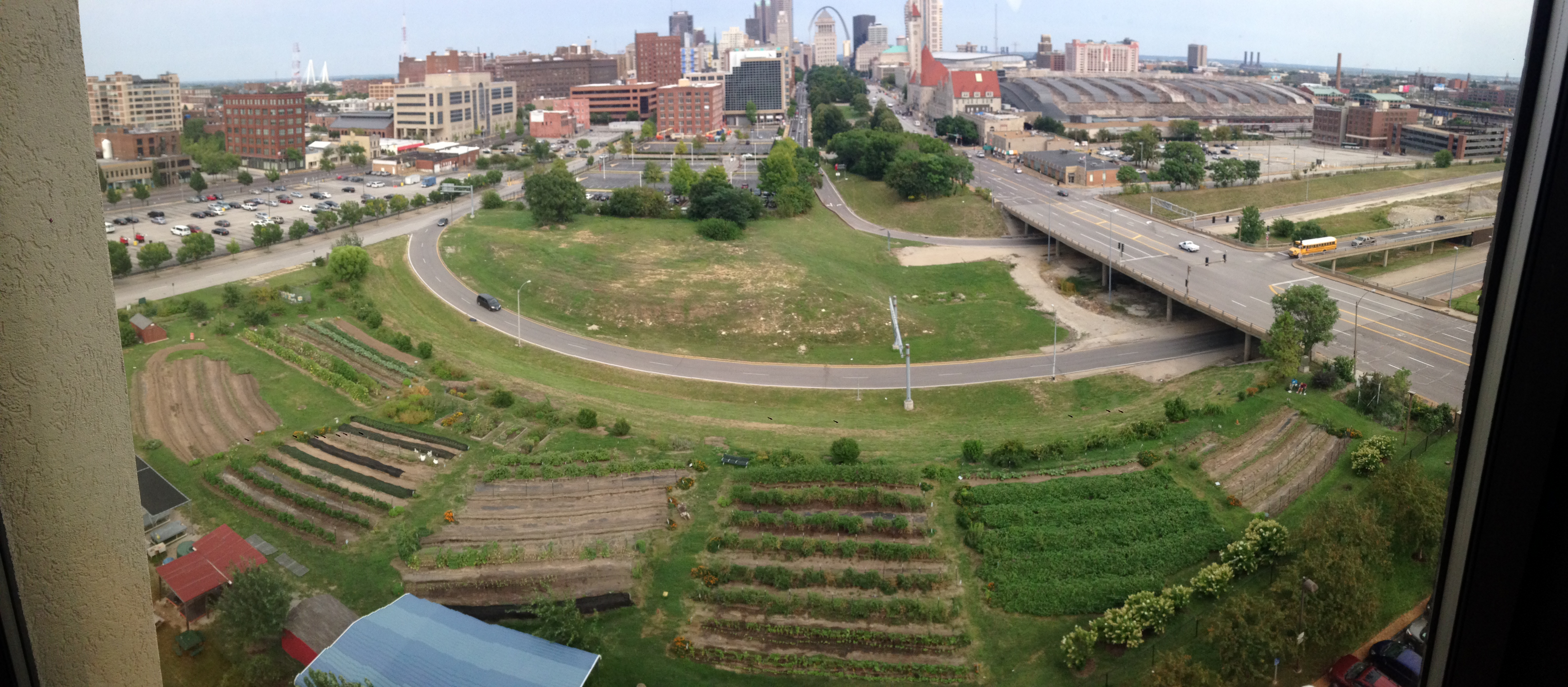
An aerial view of the Gateway Greening Urban Farm (GGUF) located in the heart of downtown St. Louis, MO

Formerly known as City Seeds, the Gateway Greening Urban Farm was a 2.5 acre property located in downtown St. Louis, on land owned by the Missouri Department of Transportation. The farm produced an average of 16,000 lbs. of fresh produce each year thanks to the efforts of staff, volunteers, and program participants. The urban farm programming ended in 2017 and the land is now used for the St. Louis City Soccer team stadium.

Founded in 2005, the Gateway Greening Urban Farm (GGUF) came about through collaboration between several St. Louis organizations and the awarding of a Community Food Project Grant from the United States Department of Agriculture Cooperative State Research, Education, and Extension Service (CSREES). At the time of its funding, the farm's mission was to “increase production and distribution of locally grown fresh food for low-income residents, increase self-sufficiency in populations experiencing addictions, mental illness, and homelessness, and provide neighborhood based nutrition and food preparation programs.” While the initial plan was to establish the farm in stages over a period of 3 years, beginning with just 10 raised beds, the increasing demand for services and a timely donation of soil allowed the farm to rapidly expand physically and programmatically within the first year. Today, the farm includes 48 raised vegetable beds, drip irrigation, native plantings, a rain garden, a dwarf fruit tree orchard, ornamental shrub borders, a rainwater catch cistern, a sheltered outdoor classroom, harvest station, composting bins, beehives and more.

Organizations that have collaborated with Gateway Greening to found the Urban Farm and its unique programs include: St. Patrick Center, St. Louis Community College at Meramec, Operation Food Search, Food Outreach, New Roots Urban Farm, St. Louis Master Gardeners, and UMSL’s Public Policy Research Center. The Urban Farm is located on land supplied by the Missouri Department of Transportation.

=== Food production and distribution ===
Produce grown on the farm is distributed throughout the St. Louis community in a variety of ways. Gateway Greening offers a Community Supported Agriculture (CSA) program in which members of the community purchase a ‘share’ in the spring, and in return receive weekly parcels of vegetables, harvested fresh from the farm. Funds raised through CSA sales are used to purchase necessary supplies and to support ongoing programs at the Gateway Greening Urban Farm. Outside of the CSA, food is often donated to local organizations such as Food Outreach.

=== Therapeutic Job Training Program ===
This program combines intensive hands on training in landscaping and horticulture with therapeutic horticulture.

=== Dig It! teen employment program ===
During the summer, participating youth work approximately 24 hours a week over a 10-week period, earning above minimum wage.

=== Garden education workshops ===
Seed St. Louis offers free Garden Education Workshops most Saturdays from March to October at Bell Demonstration Garden and Carriage House. In these workshops, community and backyard gardeners alike can learn about a wide array of garden care and landscaping principles. In 2016, workshops covered such topics as: Spring, Summer, and Fall Planting, Chicken Keeping, Disease ID & Prevention, Planting with Natives, Raised Bed and Compost Bin Construction, and many more. These workshops are financed in part through an allocation of Community Development Block Grant funds from the Department of Housing and Urban Development and the City of St. Louis’ Community Development Administration.

=== Lecture series ===
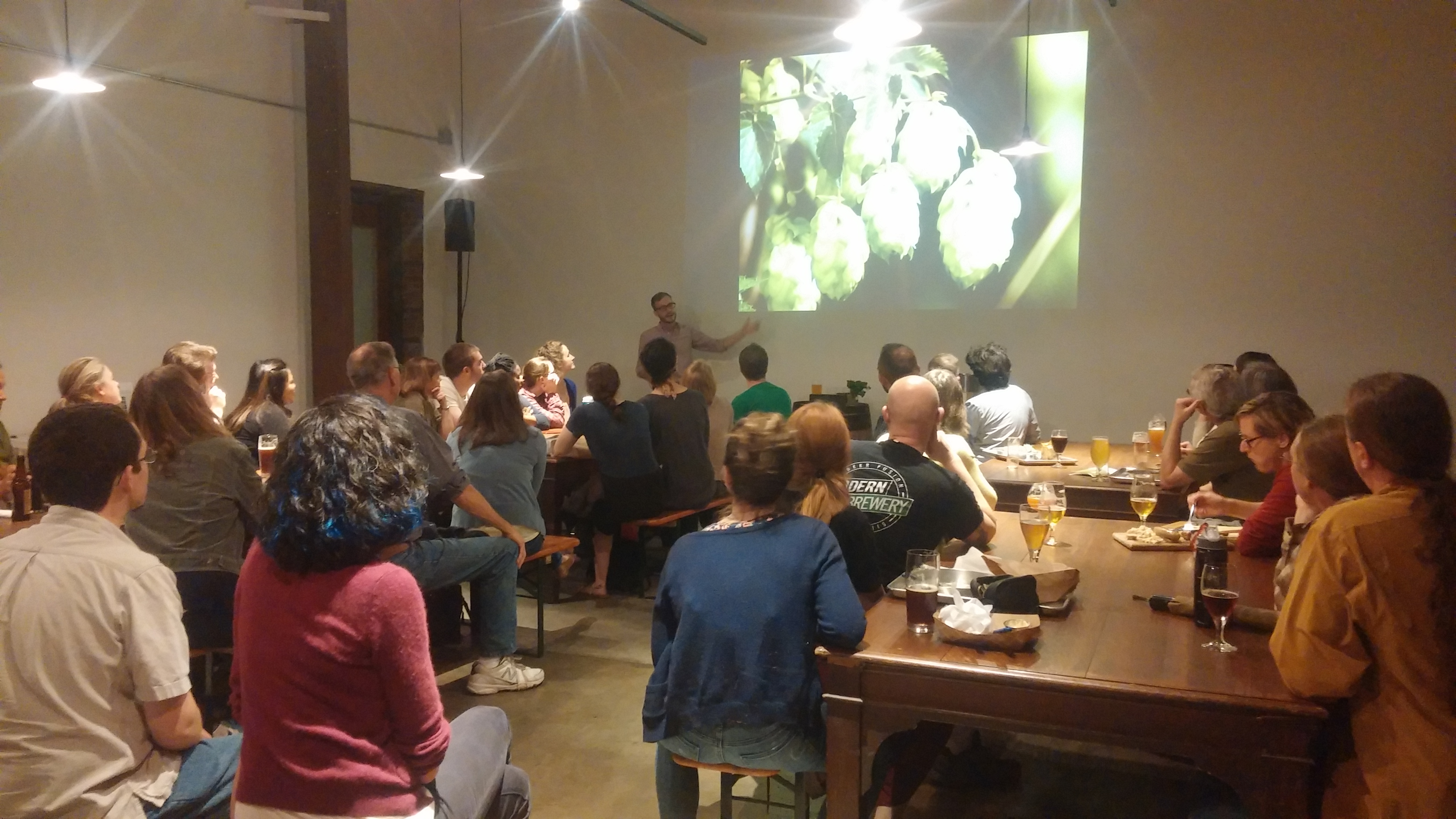
Pints 'n' Plants lecture - Beer and Home Gardening

As part of its community outreach program, Gateway Greening hosts two separate lecture series: "Pints ‘n’ Plants" which is held in the evening on the 3rd Wednesday of the month at the Urban Chestnut Brewing Company - Manchester, and features guest lecturers covering a diverse array of topics that are presented in 45 minute segments, and the "Lunch ‘n’ Learn" lecture series which is held at Schlafly Bottleworks and focuses on food policy issues related to urban agriculture and sustainable farming methods, both locally and nationally.

== Volunteerism ==
Beyond the day-to-day operations, the Gateway Greening Urban Farm provides a valuable resource for individuals, companies and organizations throughout St. Louis who are seeking volunteer activities in their community. On average, the farm hosts 1000 volunteers each year. Many local schools also use the farm as a field trip destination, where students can see and experience organic agriculture without ever leaving the city.

== Urban Roots Civic Greening Initiative ==
Gateway Greening's Civic Greening project, Urban Roots, was an annual beautification project for downtown St. Louis. Each year, Gateway Greening staff and volunteers came together with St. Louis Master Gardeners to brighten the downtown landscape with beautiful summer flowers at Kiener Plaza. This program has been suspended due to ongoing construction projects.
