= Evans-Allen funds =

Evans-Allen funds (or Payments to 1890 colleges) are federal funds distributed to the 1890 (historically black) land grant colleges of agriculture under a provision in the National Agricultural Research, Extension, and Teaching Policy Act of 1977 (P.L. 95-113, Title XIV), to support research programs. The provision became known by the names of two of its primary proponents in Congress, Representative Frank Evans of Colorado and Senator James Allen of Alabama.
