= Agriculture in the Classroom =

United States educational program

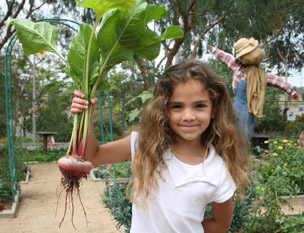

Agriculture in the Classroom (AITC) is a grassroots program coordinated by the United States Department of Agriculture (USDA) and the National Agriculture in the Classroom Organization. Its goal is to help students gain greater awareness of the role of agriculture in the economy and society, so that they may become citizens who support wise agricultural policies. AITC raises agricultural literacy by helping students understand the farm sources of their food, fabric and flowers.

The program is carried out in each state, according to state needs and interests, by individuals representing farm organizations, agribusiness, education and government.

The USDA supports the state organizations by:

- helping to develop Agriculture in the Classroom programs,
- acting as a central clearinghouse for materials and information,
- encouraging USDA agencies to assist in the state programs, and
- coordinating with national organizations to promote the goal of an increased awareness of agriculture among the nation's students.

== History ==
Throughout much of the history of the United States, agriculture and education have been closely related. During the decades when most Americans lived on farms or in small towns, students often did farm chores before and after school. The school year was determined by planting, cultivating and harvesting schedules. Old school books are full of agricultural references and examples because farming and farm animals were a familiar part of nearly every child's life.

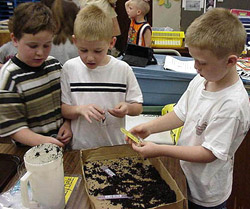

In the 1920s, 30s and 40s, as the farm population shrank and agricultural emphasis decreased in school books and educational materials, educators focused on agriculture as an occupational specialty, rather than an integral part of every student's life. Agriculture education was mainly offered to those few students wanting to make a career of agriculture.

During this period, a small nucleus of educators and others persistently pushed for more agriculture in education. They recognized the interlocking role of farming and food and fiber production with environmental quality, including wildlife habitat, clean water, and the preservation and improvement of forests. They kept interest in agriculture and the environment alive during a period when interest by the public as a whole was decreasing.

During the 1960s and 70s, as experienced agriculture, conservation, and forestry organizations realized the need for quality material, many excellent films, literature, and classroom aids were financed and produced by businesses, foundations, nonprofit groups and associations, as well as state and federal agencies. There was, however, little coordination of effort or exchange of ideas among the groups and no central point for national coordination.

In 1981, at the invitation of the U.S. Department of Agriculture, representatives of agricultural groups and educators came to a meeting in Washington, D.C., to discuss agricultural literacy. A national task force was selected from this group. Representation came from agriculture, business, education, and governmental agencies, some of whom were already conducting educational programs in agriculture.

This new task force recommended that the U.S. Department of Agriculture would be the coordinator and that it would sponsor regional meetings to help states organize their own programs. They also urged the department to encourage the support of other national groups.

As a result, in 1981, the USDA established Agriculture in the Classroom, which has the endorsement of all living former Secretaries of Agriculture, the National Association of State Departments of Agriculture, the National Conference of States Legislatures, most of the Governors of the States, and the major agricultural organizations and commodity groups. Significant progress has been made through these partnerships of agriculture, business, education, government and dedicated volunteers.

The late Dr. Norman Borlaug, a Nobel prize Laureate, wanted to make it known prior to his death in September 2009 that it was hard for him to stomach the disconnection American students in public education have with agriculture. In a message to Agriculture in the Classroom teachers, Dr. Borlaug encourages the educators that are in public and private schools to develop many more courses on agriculture and food production and also to make it compulsory for students to be enrolled in these classes. Borlaug also takes time to mention that only four percent of children in the industrialized countries and less than two percent in the United States are directly connected to a production-based agriculture farming operation.

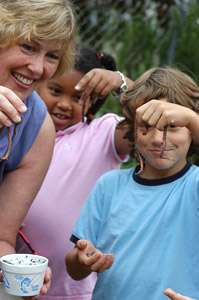

== Conferences ==
Each year, the National AITC Consortium and the US Department of Agriculture host a conference designed to help teacher, volunteers, state and local coordinators and others learn more about raising students' agricultural literacy. Special speakers, workshops, tours and other special events focus on organizing efforts to enhance the community's knowledge of the sources of their food and fiber.

== Agriculture in the Classroom Consortium ==
The national Agriculture in the Classroom Consortium is the organization of state AITC programs and professional association of state AITC representatives, whose purpose is to assume and maintain an active national role in promoting agricultural literacy programs by providing leadership and a professional network for state AITC Programs and work to insure continuity of the AITC at USDA.

The AITC Consortium co-sponsors the annual National AITC Conference, coordinates a teacher award program, and helps manage grant programs. It also lobbies on behalf of agricultural literacy and acts as the liaison between AITC and other organizations, businesses and others interested in promoting agricultural literacy. It also compiles data and reports about agricultural literacy.
