= American Community Gardening Association =

Non-profit organization

The American Community Gardening Association (ACGA) is a non-profit organization working in support of community greening in rural and urban areas, headquartered in Blacksburg, Virginia across Canada and the United States. ACGA and its member organizations work together to promote community food and ornamental gardening, preservation and management of open space, urban forestry, and integrated planning and management of developing urban and rural lands.

== See also ==
- Community gardening in the United States
