= National Association of County Agricultural Agents =

American agricultural association

The National Association Of County Agricultural Agents (NACAA) is an American professional association for cooperative extension agents and specialists who are employed by cooperative state extension services and are members of their state associations. Annual meetings have taken place since 1915.
