= Guerrilla activism =

Guerrilla activism is a form of activism that is characterized by direct, spontaneous, low-cost, and unconventional action to achieve a certain desired goal, rather than more traditional and conservative forms of activism, that are generally more bureaucratic and progress slower, like petitions for political reform.

== Examples ==
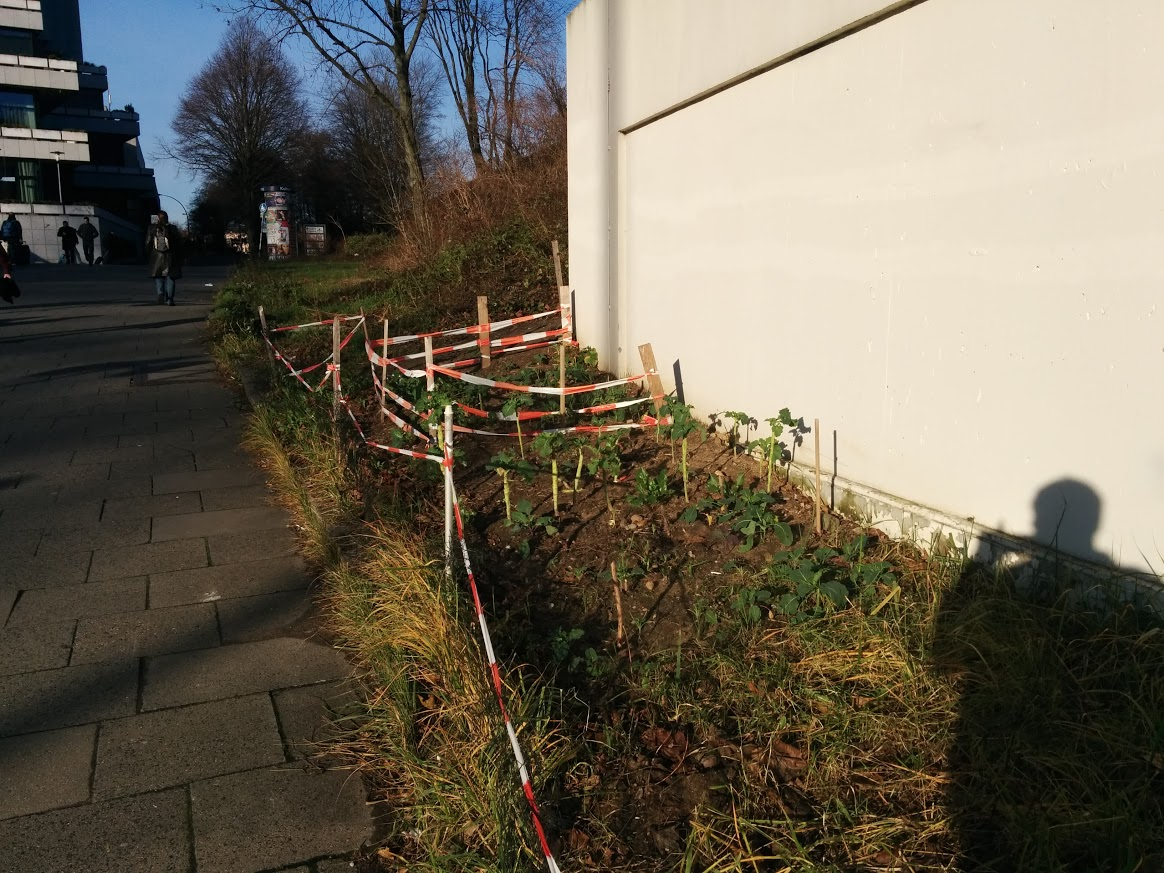
Guerilla Gardening in Bahnhof Hamburg Dammtor

A common instance of Guerrilla activism includes Guerrilla gardening.

=== United States ===
In San Francisco, California, a team of anonymous activists installed twenty benches near bus stops in 2025. Each bench took approximately two days and $100 in materials to complete, significantly cheaper and quicker than the usual process in the city.

In 2025 and 2026, arrests were made against people in Los Angeles county who painted crosswalks and placed stop-signs and at busy, neglected intersections.
