= Wallace E. Howell =

American meteorologist (1914–1999)

Wallace E. Howell (1914–1999) was an American meteorologist known for his work in cloud seeding and weather modification.

== Early life and education ==
Wallace was born in 1914. He studied at Harvard University in the 1930s and served as a weatherman with the Army Air Corps during World War II. In 1948, he earned a doctorate from the Massachusetts Institute of Technology, focusing on cloud physics and the use of silver iodide and dry ice in cloud seeding.

== Career ==
Over his career, Howell conducted cloud seeding operations in countries such as Canada, Cuba, Peru, and the Philippines, aiming to increase rainfall for agricultural and hydroelectric purposes. In the 1960s, he developed an early snow-making machine for ski resorts and served as president of the weather observatory on Mount Washington in New Hampshire.

During the New York water shortage of 1949–1950, Howell was commissioned to induce rainfall using aerial seeding and ground-based generators. His efforts received extensive media coverage. While initial attempts were unsuccessful due to unfavorable weather conditions, later operations coincided with increased reservoir levels and the lifting of water restrictions. His activities were controversial; some local farmers and resort owners claimed that the induced rainfall harmed crops and deterred vacationers, leading to lawsuits that were eventually dismissed. Howell was cautious in attributing the increased rainfall solely to his efforts, suggesting that his work may have contributed to a modest increase.
