= Proplifting =

Practice of taking discarded plant material and propagating new plants from them

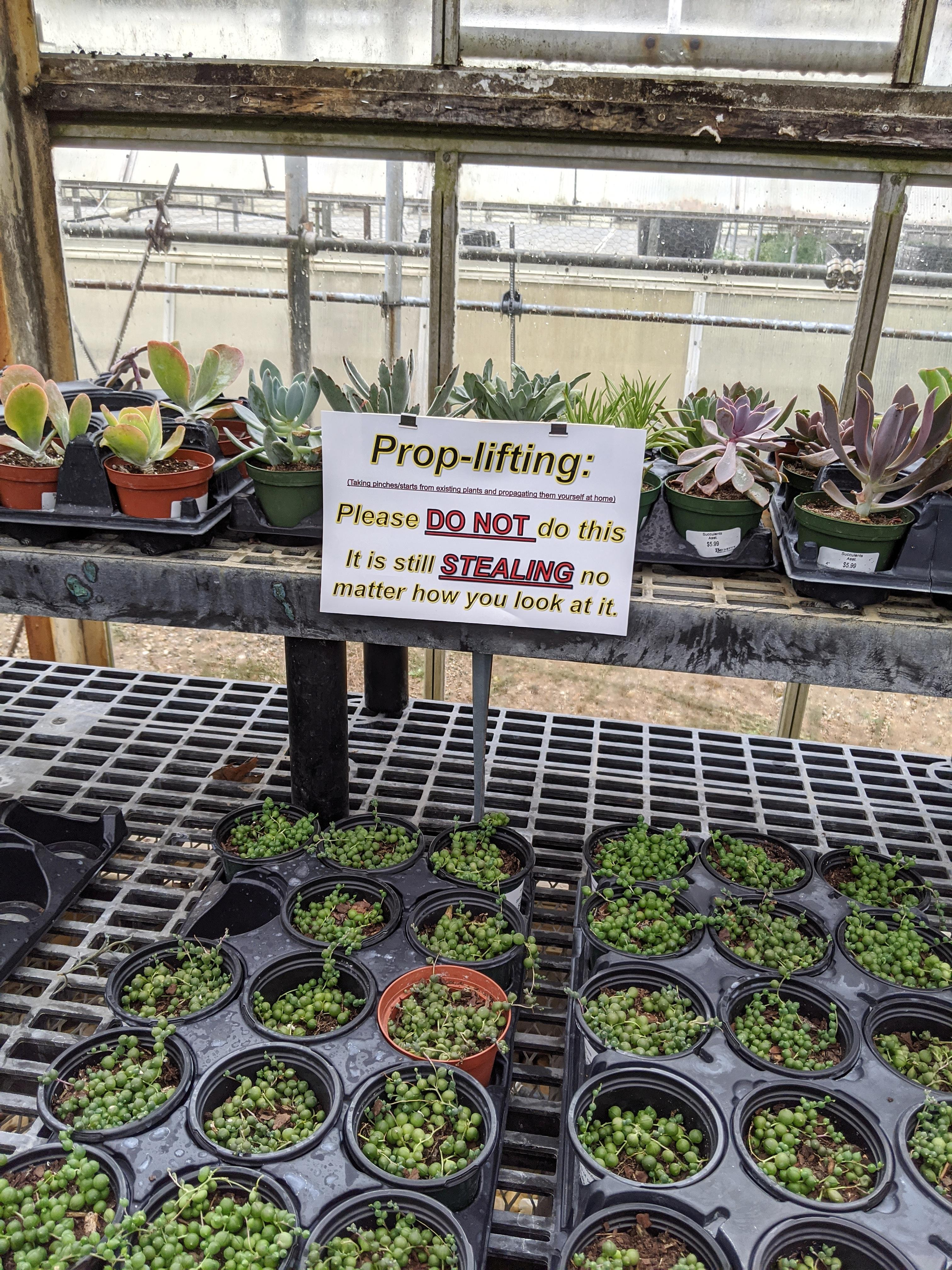
A sign at a garden center asking people not to proplift, which it defines as taking cuttings

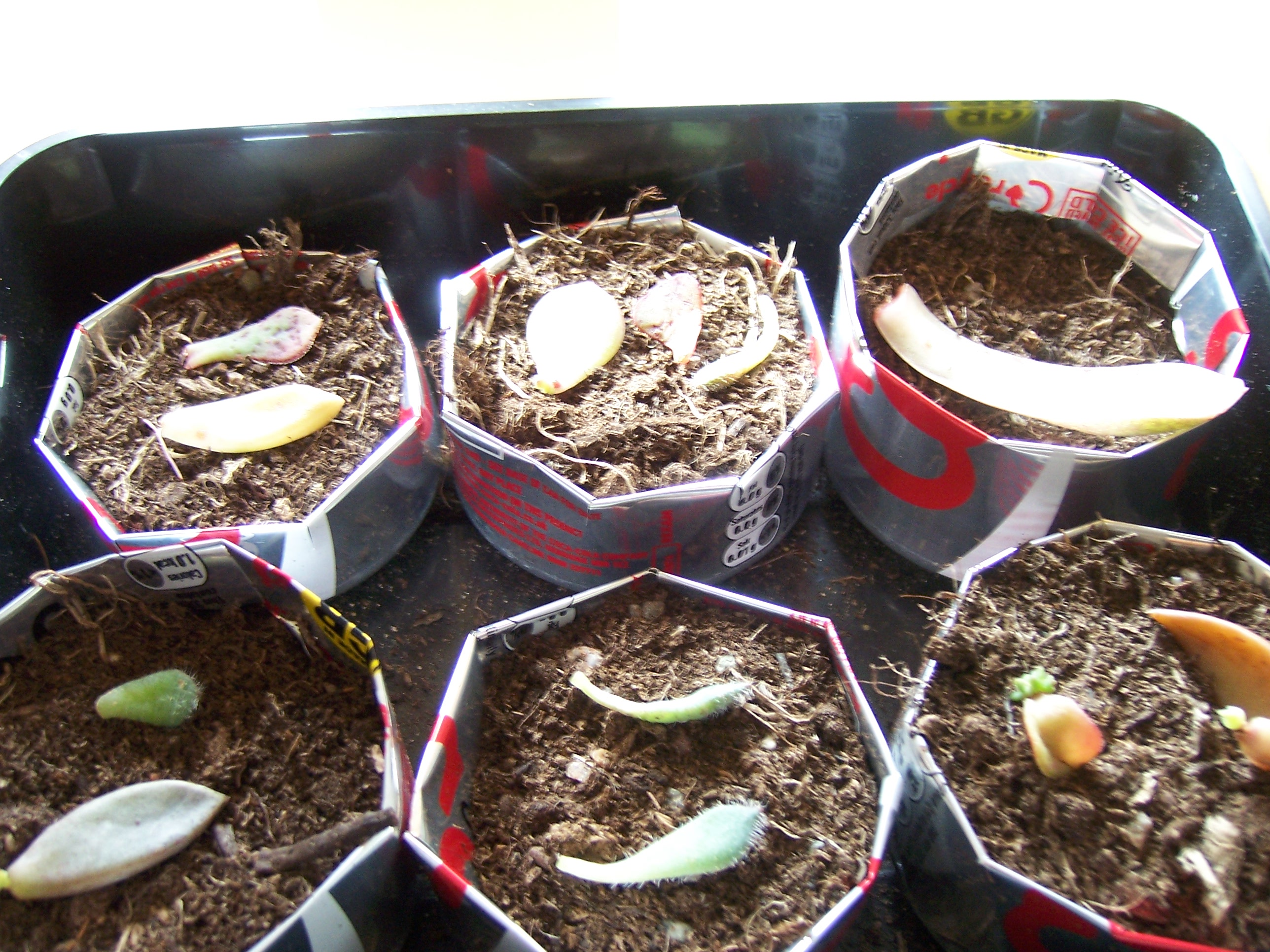
Succulent leaves being propagated

Proplifting (sometimes written prop-lifting) is the practice of taking discarded plant material and propagating new plants from them. Some proplifters engage with the hobby as a form of self-administered horticultural therapy.

== Etymology and origin ==
The word is a portmanteau of 'propagate' and 'shoplifting'. However, this derivation is misleading as ethical proplifters are advised to seek permission first to take such floor sweepings. Though much of the material would be thrown out, it is technically the property of the store or business where found. Also, ethical proplifting excludes the practice of removing leaves from living plants as such unauthorized removal is theft. The term was coined by Sarina Daniels, the founder of the r/proplifting subreddit, as a joke, while she was participating in r/Succulents in 2017. Though proplifting started as a joke, it quickly became an online community of dedicated practitioners, surprising Daniels. Even so, proplifting practitioners have been accused of being common thieves.

== Practice ==
Practitioners often gather fallen leaves of succulents and other plants from the floors of big-box stores. Proponents state the practice rescues something that would otherwise go to waste, and gives the plants a new chance at life. It is also touted as much more economical than purchasing full-grown plants. Some chains, such as Walmart, have even publicly approved of the practice. Proplifting from smaller stores is discouraged, as these stores will propagate the material themselves.

=== Cutting from live plants ===
Clipping off pieces of living plants for sale is a discouraged practice even among proponents of proplifting. This practice is becoming more common, and not just at large corporate chains. Smaller stores also have lost revenue when they cannot sell plants that have been damaged by cutting, and even San Diego Botanic Garden was targeted by plant thieves cutting living plants. Enthusiasts are strongly encouraged by the community not to clip live plants and to trade or buy rarer cuttings within the community instead. Despite communities of proplifters encouraging asking permission and discouraging cutting and outright theft, others see it as a slippery slope from one to the other.

== Legality ==
Some plants cannot be propagated legally at all, even if purchased. In the United States such actions may violate the Plant Patent Act of 1930 or the Plant Variety Protection Act of 1970. In the United States, there is no common law expectation of privacy for discarded materials, making the collection of plant material from garbage legal.

== See also ==
- Seed bombing
- Plant poaching
- The Orchid Thief
- Guerrilla gardening
- Dumpster diving
