= Broadcast seeding =

Practice of scattering seeds across a large area

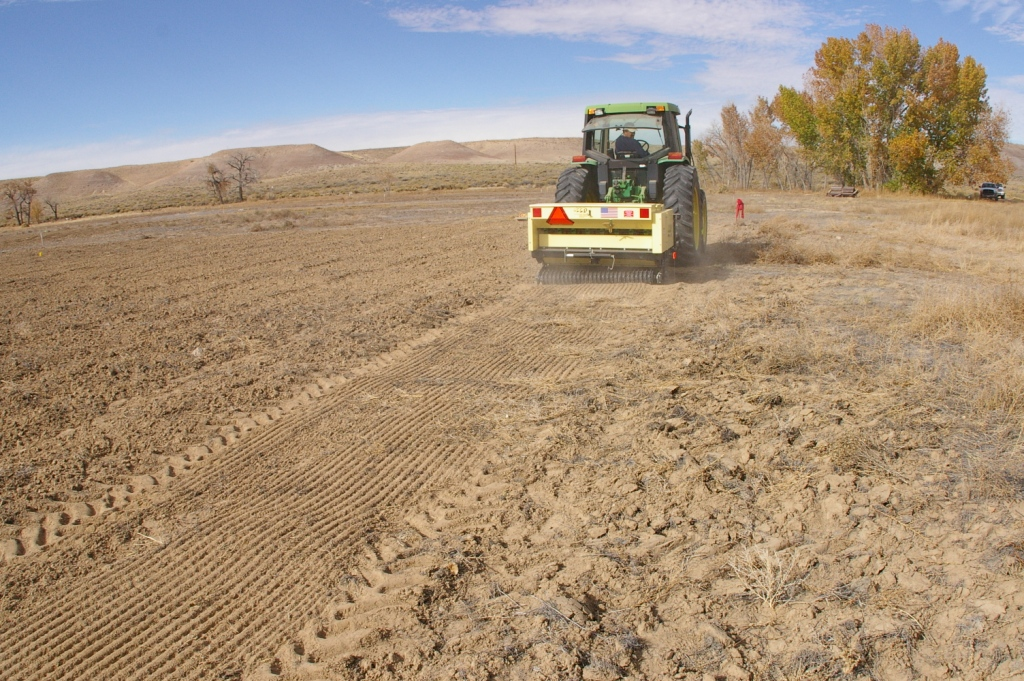
Broadcast seeder machine

In agriculture, gardening, and forestry, broadcast seeding is a method of seeding that involves scattering seed, by hand or mechanically, over a relatively large area. This is in contrast to:

- precision seeding, where seed is placed at a precise spacing and depth;
- hydroseeding, where a slurry of seed, mulch and water is sprayed over prepared ground in a uniform layer.

Broadcast seeding is of particular use in establishing dense plant spacing, as for cover crops and lawns. In comparison to traditional drill planting, broadcast seeding will require 10–20% more seed. It is simpler, faster, and easier than traditional row sowing. Broadcast seeding works best for plants that do not require singular spacing or that are more easily thinned later. After broadcasting, seed is often lightly buried with some type of raking action, often done using vertical tillage tools. Utilizing these tools increases the success rate of germination by increasing seed-to-soil contact.

Seeds sown in this manner are distributed unevenly, which may result in overcrowding. This method may not ensure that all seeds are sown at the correct depth. Incorrect depth, if too deep, would result in germination that would not allow the young plant to break the surface of the soil and prevent sprouting. If they are not sown evenly then there would be a lack of various nutrients from sunlight, oxygen, et cetera, in many crops or plants.

Not all seeds are good candidates for broadcast seeding. Often, only smaller seeds will sprout and continue to grow successfully when planted by way of broadcasting. In general, the larger the seed, the deeper it can be planted.

Broadcasting is used in areas of low rainfall and low soil fertility. It is a seeding method often used in areas that are too heavily sloped or wet to use mechanical seeding methods. Broadcast seeding may be suited for seeding smaller plots that are less than 1 acre (0.4047 hectares) in area. It has the potential for loss of seeds and the yield can be low, so it is typically recommended to double the seeding rate when broadcasting to ensure a viable stand. It is a prevalent method of seeding in areas where labor is costly and expensive.

== See also ==
- Aerial seeding
