= Plant collecting =

Practice of gathering plant specimens

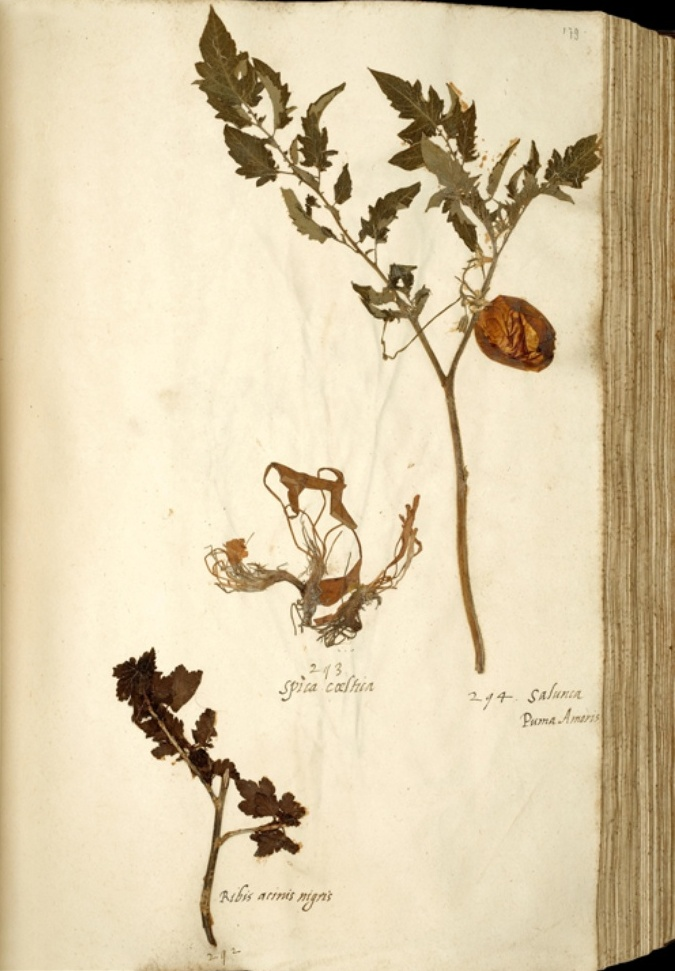
Solanum lycopersicum var. lycopersicum: the oldest surviving tomato fruit and leaves. Page from the En Tibi Herbarium, 1558. Naturalis Biodiversity Center.

Plant collecting is the acquisition of plant specimens for the purposes of research, cultivation, or as a hobby. Plant specimens may be kept alive, but are more commonly dried and pressed to preserve the quality of the specimen. Plant collecting is an ancient practice with records of a Chinese botanist collecting roses over 5000 years ago.

Herbaria are collections of preserved plant specimens and their associated data for scientific purposes. The largest herbarium in the world exists at the Muséum National d'Histoire Naturelle, in Paris, France. Plant samples in herbaria typically include a reference sheet with information about the plant and details of collection. This detailed and organized system of filing provides horticulturists and other researchers alike with a way to find information about a certain plant, and a way to add new information to an existing plant sample file.

The collection of live plant specimens from the wild, sometimes referred to as plant hunting, is an activity that has occurred for centuries. The earliest recorded evidence of plant hunting was in 1495 BC when botanists were sent to Somalia to collect incense trees for Queen Hatshepsut. The Victorian era saw a surge in plant hunting activity as botanical adventurers explored the world to find exotic plants to bring home, often at considerable personal risk. These plants usually ended up in botanical gardens or the private gardens of wealthy collectors. Prolific plant hunters in this period included William Lobb and his brother Thomas Lobb, George Forrest, Joseph Hooker, Charles Maries and Robert Fortune.

== Sample gathering ==
When collecting a sample it is important to first make sure that land you are collecting on allows for the removal of natural specimens. The first step of plant collection begins with the selection of the sample. Viable samples include identifying features such as flowers, fruits, root systems or any other unique features. Smaller plants may require multiple individuals to make up a sample. Plants that show signs of infection should be avoided to prevent spreading the disease. The next step after finding a suitable plant for collection is to assign it with a number for record keeping purposes. This number system is up to the individual collector, but usually involves the date of collection or the sequential number of that collection. Along with an assigned number, observations about the plant's location and live appearance should be noted in detail. These field notes will accompany the finished sample to provide supplementary information about the plant.

=== Plant pressing ===
Proper pressing and mounting techniques are critical to the longevity of a collected plant sample. Properly preserved plant samples can last for hundreds of years. The New York Botanical Garden itself holds plant samples that date back to the Lewis and Clark Expedition of 1804–1806.

==== Compression ====
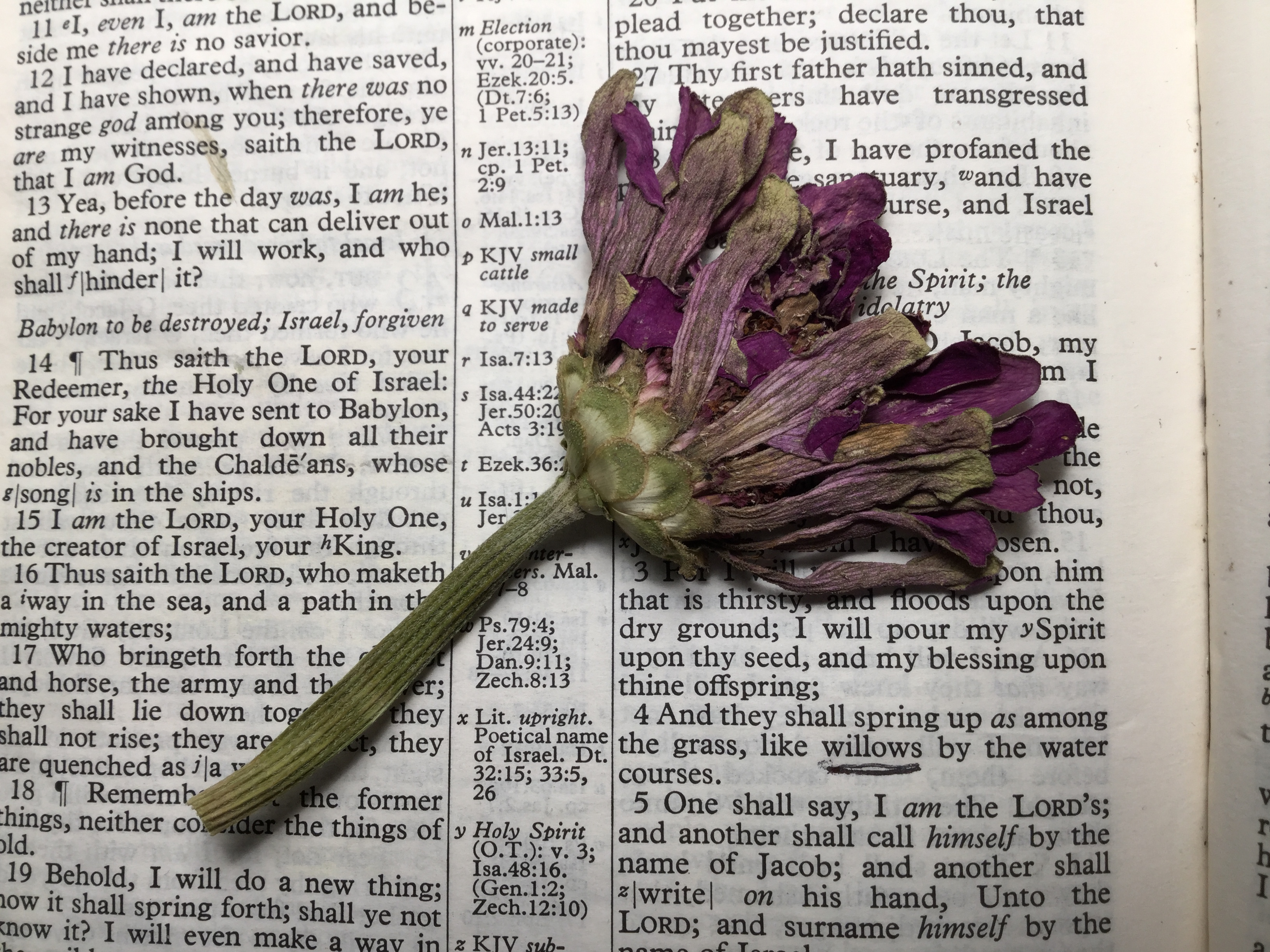
A book with a weighted object on top of it can be used to press plants

After cleaning the sample of any mud or dirt, the next step is to press the sample. Some samples may press better if they have been left to wilt for a few days. However plants should never be allowed to spoil or decompose before pressing, as this will impact the quality of the dried product. Plant presses are most commonly constructed with two flat smooth pieces of wood, and some type of compression mechanism. Compression may be accomplished with tightened nuts and bolts on the corners of the press, with tightened straps around the press, or by placing weights on top of the press. A book with a weighted object on top of it can also act as a press. When placing in the press, plant samples should be sandwiched between a few layers of absorbent blotter. Newspaper and cardboard are two common choices for blotter material. When arranging the plant in the press it is important to remember that the dried plant product will be fragile and inflexible, so position the plant exactly as you wish the final product to appear. Tighten the press and wait approximately a day to check up on the plant. The blotter should be taken out and replaced with dry blotter roughly every 24 hours. Complete drying time will vary depending on the type of plant, but is generally 1–10 days. Fleshier plants such as succulents will take longer.

==== Mounting ====
After the plant sample has been sufficiently dried and pressed, it must be mounted. The quality of mounting not only impacts the appearance of the plant sample, but also determines the rate of deterioration the sample will experience. Herbarium quality mounts use specialized paper for the best protection against deterioration. This paper can either be 100% alpha cellulose paper or cotton "rag" paper. These types of paper are ideal for preserving plant samples because they are acid free and pH neutral. Samples can be strapped to the paper with linen tape, or glued onto the sheet. If glue is needed, it is recommended that Grade A methyl cellulose mixed with water be used for optimal deterioration resistance.

==== Storage ====
In order for plant specimens to be kept in good condition for future reference, adequate storage conditions are needed. The storage space should be kept in a low light, low humidity environment. The temperature of the storage space should be kept cool, between 50 and 65 °F (10–18 °C).

It is important to keep the storage space free of harmful pests. It is recommended to protect the specimens by sheathing the sheets in sealed plastic bags. Various pesticides may also be used to protect the storage space from pest infestation. If pest infestation has already occurred, the samples should be frozen for three to four days. Freezing new additions of plant samples is a suggested preventative measure against the introduction of pest to the storage space.

=== Preservation without pressing ===
Some specimens cannot be compressed, degrade when dried, or require other techniques for preservation and storage. Large seeds or fruits may be stored in boxes without compression. Aquatic plants and delicate plants may be stored in a liquid preservative. Cacti may be stored in ethanol.

In cases where drying or pressing a plant may destroy or alter a plant feature being studied, 50-75% ethanol can be used to preserve the specimen for up to 4 weeks. This is commonly used when sectioning tissue samples.

If a collector wishes to preserve a flower in its natural shape they will use a desiccant. The most commonly used desiccant is silica gel. To do this flowers are placed in a box, and the desiccant is added till the flowers are covered. After 2–7 days the desiccant is removed, revealing the preserved flowers.

== Collection of herbarium specimens ==
Herbarium specimens of plants are collected for a number of different uses. They can assist in accurate identification and provide a species record for a time and place that can be used in distribution maps. They can also provide biological material for researchers, a reference point to document scientific names and vouchers for research and seed collections. DNA barcoding, a new method of identification of plant vouchers, is being used in herbaria across the world. The Smithsonian National Museum of Natural History creates their barcodes from a short sequence of plant DNA, which can be easily identified from all healthy specimens of the species. This barcode is then printed and placed onto the plant mount. By creating these DNA barcodes, the process of organizing and loaning plant specimens becomes more streamlined and can be mechanized.

=== Voucher specimens ===
Voucher specimens are select herbarium specimens. What distinguishes these specimens from others is that a voucher specimen is a "representative sample of an expertly identified organism." These specimens are usually associated with a professional research article and are considered to be more official references than a typical herbarium specimen. Voucher specimens can be useful in many ways such as use for comparison when scientists think they have found a new species or when dichotomous keys have narrowed the possible species down to a few that have minute differences.

== Plant collecting as a hobby ==
Plant collecting may also refer to a hobby, in which the hobbyist takes identifiable samples of plant species found in nature, dries them, and stores them in a paper sheet album, a simple herbarium, along with the information of the finding location, finding date, etc. necessary scientific information. As in many collecting hobbies, rarer specimens have been valued. However, when collecting living organisms, the conservation aspects must precede the collector's ambitions. This has led in some cases to a collector voluntarily taking part, helping scientists, in some research areas, provided they can store the "collectible". In fact, historically, many species have initially been found within a collection of a collector.

Usually, a plant can be identified in nature, since they are stationary. The advent of digital cameras has led many plant collectors to switch totally to photography. Some have switched to collecting live specimens of various plant species in their gardens, building a sort of "private botanical garden". Some have specialized in a specific group, the orchids and the roses and their cultivars are among the most collected.

Recently plant identification apps have begun to be used by hobbyist plant collectors and casual plant enjoyers. The most common and accessible of these is Google Lens, others include Seek by INaturalist and Plant Snap. These plant identification apps allow users to make field identifications of plants down to the species level. However, for accurate identification of specimens the use of dichotomous keys is still required, as no plant identification app has reached an accuracy of 90%.This has made plant collecting and identification more accessible to casual hobbyist and students.

== Poaching ==
Illegal collection of plants is known as plant poaching. A report on the risk of rare plant poaching has provided data showing possible connections between geography and the rate of poaching in the Shenandoah National Park, Virginia, United States. The openings for poaching were found to be increased in locations with easy accessibility, such as roads, trails, and developed areas. The condition of the environment can determine the levels of poaching, with regions of higher quality receiving more attention from poachers.

=== Ethics and prevention ===
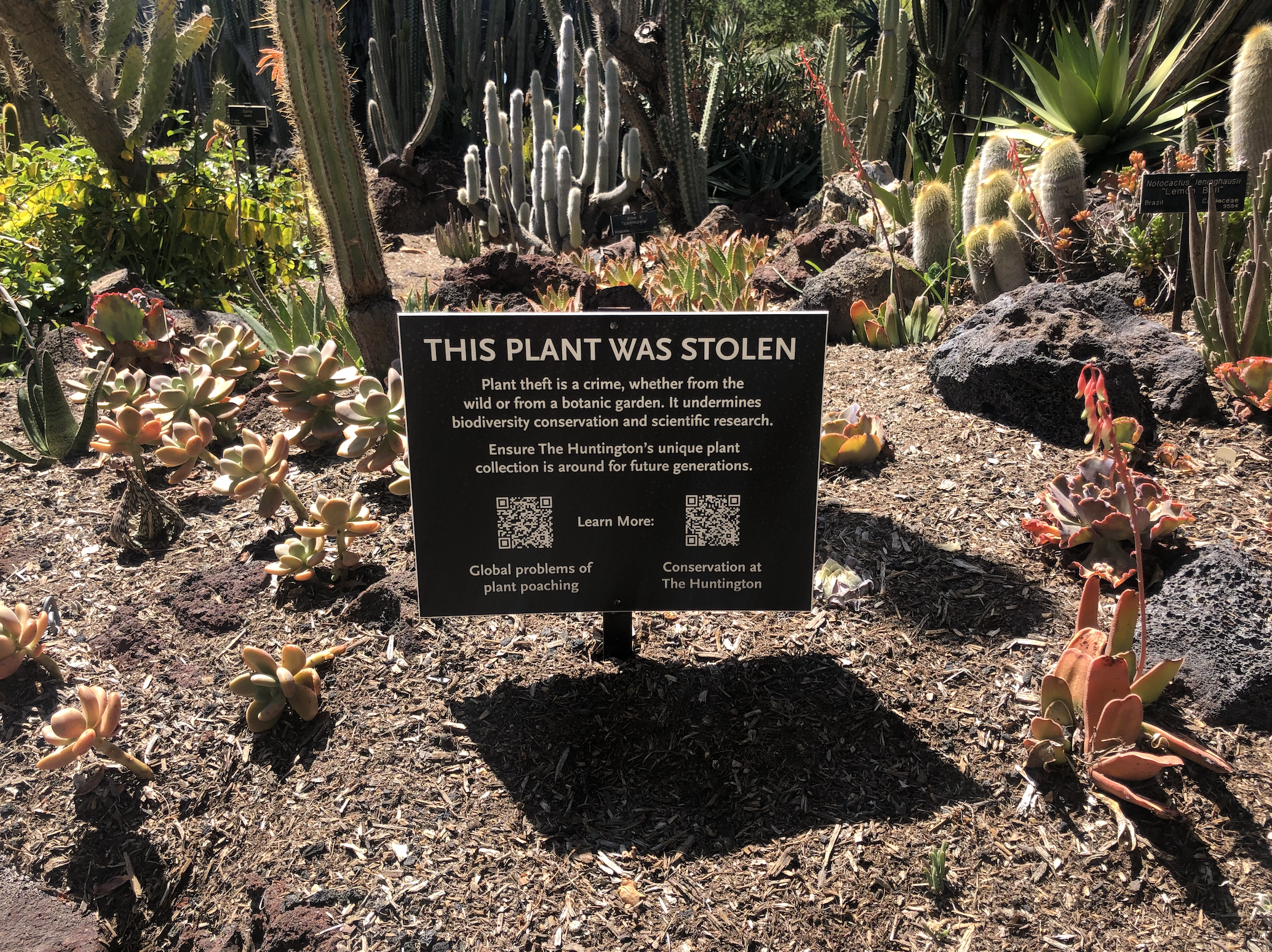
Huntington Library Desert Garden Plant Theft Prevention Sign

The hobby and practice of plant collecting is known to have been the cause of declines in certain plant populations. This can be the result of hobbyists being oblivious to the status of a particular species, collectors of valuable species for profit, or researchers over collecting to fill slots in herbaria. This issue can be solved with proper research on the status of species before a plant is collected and taking the smallest sample possible. Threatened species may be listed in databases, such as the Cites (Convention on International Trade in Endangered Species) database, though poachers have been known to use these resources to identify potentially valuable species. Additionally, botanical gardens themselves can raise awareness of plant poaching. The Huntington Library, Art Museum, and Botanical Gardens introduced a sign to deter plant theft in their Desert Garden.

=== Historical examples ===
There are some historical examples of widespread plant collecting that have led to extinction or near extinction of species. Many of these instances have further led to an increase in modern theft of these species, given their rarity in the modern day.

==== Victorian Fern Craze ====
An early example includes the Victorian Fern Craze, also known as Pteridomania or fern fever, which, beginning in the 1830s, drastically reduced the numbers of various fern species in the UK. In particular, many in the Woodsia genus as well as the Killarney species.

==== Orchidelirium ====
Another Victorian craze known as Orchidelirium similarly led to a drastic decline of several species of orchids. The lady's slipper orchid Cypripedium calceolus was declared extinct in the UK in 1917 and later rediscovered in 1930 as a single wild plant in the Yorkshire Dales, the only remaining site in the UK for these plants. Once found, the plant was guarded 24 hours a day.

==== Summer lady's-tresses orchid ====
In 1956, the UK's last remaining plants of the Spiranthes aestivalis, summer lady's-tresses orchid, were stolen. The orchid is still classified as extinct in the UK.

=== Modern examples ===
Many botanical gardens have been the target of plant theft, given the nature of their collections, which often house rare and valuable plants.

==== Kew Royal Botanic Gardens (2014) ====
In 2014, Kew Royal Botanic Gardens saw the theft of one of twenty-four of their Nymphaea thermarum, the world's smallest water lily ever discovered. There are about 100 of these species left, which survive solely in botanical gardens, last seen in the wild in 2008.

==== Kirstenbosch National Botanical Garden (2014) ====
In 2014 in two separate incidents, a total of twenty four cycads were taken from the Kirstenbosch National Botanical Garden in Cape Town, South Africa. Twenty-two of those twenty-four were Albany cycads, a species on the critically endangered list with only an estimate of 80 left in the wild. The total cost of the theft amounted to an estimated 700,000 rand, or just over $45,000.

==== Christchurch Botanic Gardens (2020) ====
In September 2020, Christchurch Botanic Gardens in New Zealand had a Monstera deliciosa 'Variegata' stolen from its orchid house.

==== San Diego Botanic Garden (2021) ====
In March 2021, San Diego Botanic Garden faced an incident of attempted plant theft when a woman was seen taking a clipping from one of the gardens' collections. When confronted, she returned the clipping, but left before authorities arrived. Garden staff members believed that she got away with other clippings as well. In an interview, the president and CEO of the gardens attributed an increase in theft to "the surge in houseplant interest, which is driving plant prices higher and leading to less ethical plant-sourcing behavior."

=== Local plant poaching ===
Plant theft is not solely limited to botanical gardens with rare collections. It extends to private property and local businesses. The practice of taking fallen plant leaves or clippings for the purpose of later propagating from those pieces is known as prop-lifting and is known to be discouraged or even unethical. The California Penal Code § 384a prohibits cutting of plants from both private and public property, stating "A person shall not willfully or negligently cut, destroy, mutilate, or remove plant material that is growing upon state or county highway rights-of-way" and "A person shall not willfully or negligently cut, destroy, mutilate, or remove plant material that is growing upon public land or upon land that is not his or hers without a written permit from the owner of the land, signed by the owner of the land or the owner's authorized agent, as provided in subdivision."

=== Misconceptions ===
In the United States, misconceptions around the scope of protection for certain plants are common in several states. In both California and Texas, for example, there is a prevalent but false belief that it is illegal to pick the state flower, the California poppy and the Texas bluebonnet. There are however other laws against trespass and destruction of state property, including a ban on the picking of flowers on federal, and, in California, state lands.

== Safety and precautions ==
While plant collecting may seem like a very safe and harmless practice, there is a few things collectors should keep in mind to protect themselves. First collectors should always be aware of the land where they are collecting. As in hiking there will be certain limitations to whether or not public access is granted on a plot of land and if collection from that land is allowed. For example, in a US national park, plant collection is not allowed unless given special permission. Collecting internationally will involve some logistics, such as official permits which will most likely be required to bring plants both from the country of collection and to the destination country. The major herbaria can be useful to the average hobbyist in aiding them in acquiring these permits.

If traveling to a remote location to access samples, it is safe practice to inform someone of your whereabouts and planned time of return. If traveling in hot weather, collectors should bring adequate water to avoid dehydration. Forms of sun protection such as sunscreen and wide brimmed hats may be essential depending on location. Travel to remote locations will most likely involve walking measurable distances in wild terrain, so precautions synonymous with those related to hiking should be taken.

== Terminology ==
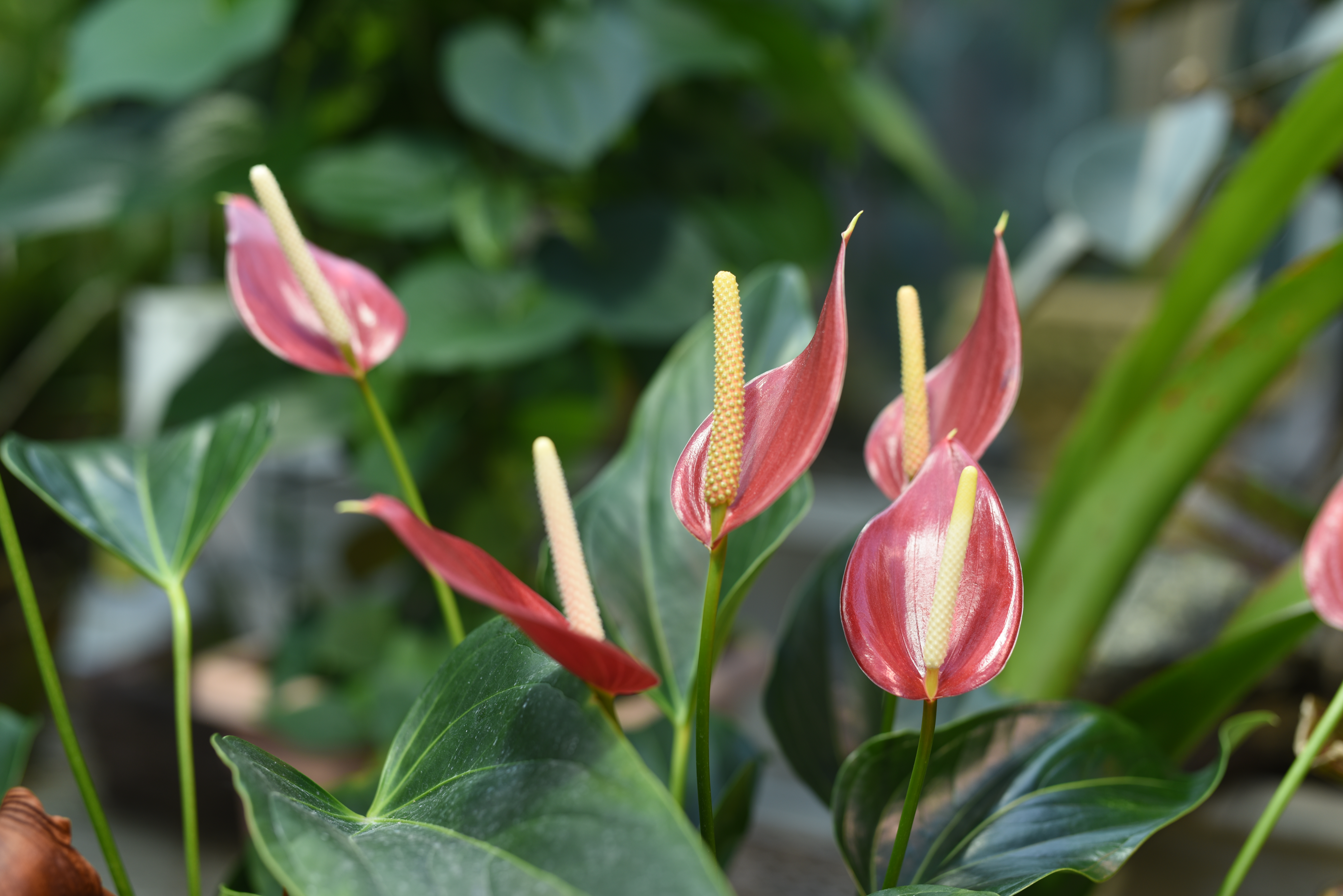
Flamingo flower

Plant "discovery" means the first time that a new plant was recorded for science, often in the form of dried and pressed plants (a herbarium specimen) being sent to a botanical establishment such as Kew Gardens in London, where it would be examined, classified and named.

Plant "introduction" means the first time that living matter – seed, cuttings or a whole plant – was brought back to Europe. Thus, the handkerchief tree (Davidia involucrata) was discovered by Père David in 1869 but introduced to Britain by Ernest Wilson in 1901.

Often, the two happened simultaneously: thus Sir Joseph Hooker discovered and introduced his Himalayan rhododendrons between 1849 and 1851.

== See also ==
- Botanical expedition
- List of Irish plant collectors
