= Guerrilla gardening =

Planting on land where not legally allowed

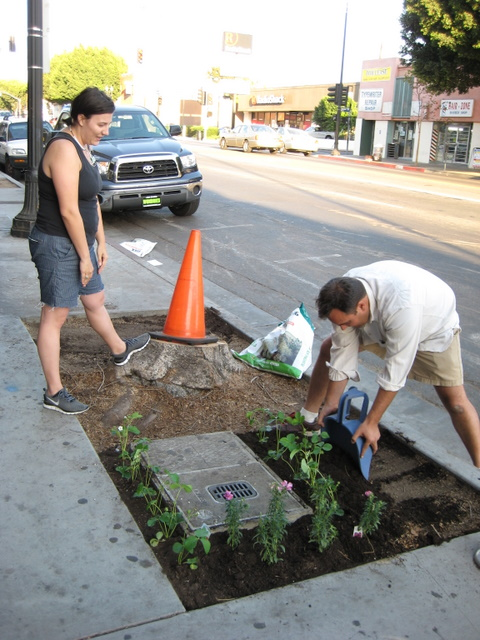
Guerrilla gardening on a Los Angeles street

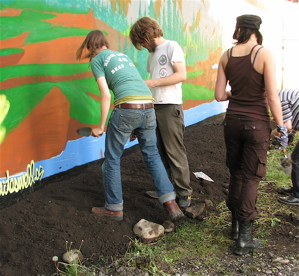
Guerrilla gardeners planting vegetables on previously empty space in downtown Calgary, Alberta, Canada

Guerrilla gardening is the act of gardening – raising food, plants, or flowers – on land that gardeners do not have the legal right to cultivate, such as abandoned sites, neglected public spaces, or private property. It encompasses a diverse range of people and motivations, ranging from gardeners who garden beyond their legal boundaries in defiance of state or local property laws, to gardeners with a deliberate political purpose, who seek to initiate change by using guerrilla gardening methods as a form of protest or direct action.

The term, "guerrilla gardening" blends the Spanish word guerrilla (meaning "little war") with gardening to symbolize grassroots, activist-style tactics used to help nature reclaim public or private space.

Guerrilla gardening often challenges social norms concerning land rights, aiming to promote criticism of how public institutions or private land owners manage property, by repurposing or reclaiming land perceived as being neglected or misused by its legal owners.

Some gardeners work at night in relative secrecy, in an effort to make the area more useful or attractive, while others garden during the day.

== History ==
Two historical examples of gardeners who engaged in guerrilla gardening were the politically radical English Diggers of the 17th century, and the 18th-century American pioneer Johnny Appleseed, who planted apple tree seedlings on unclaimed frontier land as a business venture.

The earliest recorded use of the term guerrilla gardening was by Liz Christy and her Green Guerrilla group in 1973 in the Bowery Houston area of New York. They transformed a derelict private lot into a garden. The space is still cared for by volunteers but now enjoys the protection of the city's parks department.

Guerrilla gardening takes place in many parts of the world—more than thirty countries are documented and evidence can be found online in numerous guerrilla gardening social networking groups and in the Community pages of GuerrillaGardening.org. The term bewildering has been used as a synonym for guerrilla gardening by Australian gardener Bob Crombie.

== Examples ==
=== International Sunflower Guerrilla Gardening Day ===
Since 2007, May 1 has been celebrated as an annual International Sunflower Guerrilla Day, in which guerrilla gardeners plant sunflowers in their neighborhoods.

=== Australia ===
Guerrilla gardening is prominent in Melbourne where most of the inner northern suburbs have community vegetable gardens; land adjoining rail lines has undergone regeneration of the native vegetation, including nature strips. There are a few minor disputes between guerrilla gardeners in Melbourne, with most falling into one of two groups: those concerned most with native planting and those concerned most with communal food growing. However, people with differing opinions still work together without dispute.

Growing Forward Kurilpa is a collective of people in Brisbane reclaiming unused space for guerilla gardening.

In Melbourne there is a "Guerilla Gardening Narrm" collective that was established in 2023 and has created a large community garden in Coburg called the "Radicle Roots Common", they aim to help spread the idea of localising food and "reclaim the commons" to many other communities. Guerilla Gardening Narrm was largely inspired by Growing Forward Kurilpa.

There are small community groups around Australia called "Permablitz" who gather regularly to design and construct suburban vegetable gardens for free, in an effort to educate residents on how to grow their own food and better prepare them if/when food prices become too expensive.

Australian Network 10's show Guerrilla Gardeners featured a team of gardeners who make over areas of council-owned property without them knowing.

=== Canada ===
==== Arbutus Greenway, Vancouver, BC ====
In 1902, the Arbutus corridor was a rail line developed by the Canadian Pacific Railway (CPR), connecting Vancouver harbour to the fishing village of Steveston on the South Arm of the Fraser River. In 1905, the BC Electric Company (BCEC) leased and electrified the line to operate interurban passenger rail service between Vancouver and Richmond. The BCEC passenger service was discontinued in 1952, but CPR freight operations continued infrequently until 2001.

With the end of rail operations, CPR wanted to redevelop the 17 hectare corridor for residential and commercial purposes, but was prevented by the City of Vancouver, who wanted to acquire the area for green space and (potentially) a future light rail transportation line. In 2006, the Supreme Court of Canada affirmed the city's zoning authority to prohibit CPR development, but the final disposition of the area was not resolved until 2016, when the City of Vancouver purchased the land from CPR for $55 million.

In the interim, home owners adjacent to the unused rail line and local community groups had built and maintained numerous gardens and plots on the 9 km route. The homes adjacent to the corridor are large, and they are some of the most expensive properties in the city, with the green space adding to the exclusivity of the properties. In 2014, as negotiations with the city dragged on, CPR began repairing the rail line, clearing the gardens, and preparing to run trains on the line. The city filed an injunction to block the railway from reactivating the line, but that bid was dismissed in B.C. Supreme Court. In 2016, the City finalized acquisition of the land. Terms of the complex purchase agreement included a stipulation that a portion of the corridor must be dedicated for light rail transit use.

This has not entirely ended the conflict over the area. Since acquiring the Arbutus corridor, the city has built a bike and pedestrian trail, and developed an Arbutus Greenway plan, but adjacent home owners have pushed for a return to the previous state. Many would like to leave the area wild and inaccessible which would make the now public area an exclusive green space for the wealthy adjacent home owners. The official Arbutus Greenway plan has divided the 9 km route into 8 different character zones that will include bicycle and pedestrian paths, public spaces, community gardens, plazas, and public art.

==== Guerrilla Park, Welland, ON ====
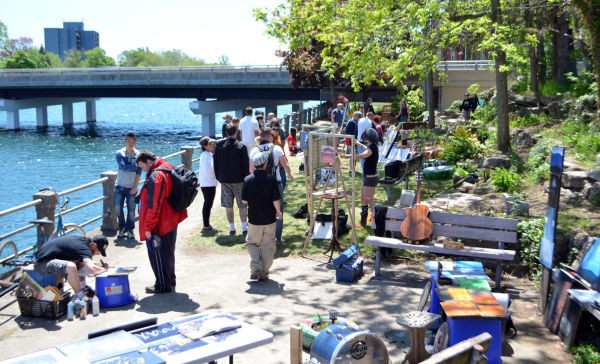
"Art at the Park" at Guerrilla Park in Welland, Ontario in 2015

Whereas most areas that are subjected to guerrilla gardening are unused or abandoned areas not designated for parkland or green space, this is an exception in that it was initially designed for such a purpose. Originally a maintained parkette in Welland, this small area along the Welland Recreational Waterway fell into disuse and neglect for years. In 2013, a handful of local residents, including visual artists and guerrilla gardeners, reclaimed the space by fully restoring overgrown flower beds, adding outdoor paintings, and overseeing general landscape maintenance. Although this area is officially municipal property, there was initially a question by volunteers as to which local organization was responsible for this parkette's maintenance (whether responsibility fell into hands of Welland Recreational Canal Corporation or City of Welland Parks Department). Volunteers met with representatives of City of Welland, and an unofficial verbal agreement was made, ensuring that although the City of Welland does own the parkette land, volunteers may continue maintenance and gardening in the area. Currently, the area attracts some local artistic, musical, and creative youth. It has also been the setting for a number of small, unorganized or impromptu events, such as art shows.

=== Denmark ===
==== "Garden in a night" ====
In 1996, Have på en nat ("Garden in a night") was made by the Danish Økologiske Igangsættere ("Organic starters"). An empty piece of land in the middle of the city at Guldbergsgade in Nørrebro, Copenhagen, Denmark, was transformed into a garden in a single night. About 1,000 people took part in the project.

=== Finland ===
==== Villi Vyöhyke r.y. (Wild Zone NGO) ====
The Villi Vyöhyke registered association is a Finnish nature conservation-focused organisation, which was founded in Tampere in 2013. Founders of the association started planting meadow plants on road embankments and wastes in urban environments. Urbanization and structural change of agriculture have made many meadow plants endangered in Finland during 20th and 21st centuries. According to members, planting wild plants in city area is in a gray area of Finnish law, meaning it is not specifically illegal. The city of Tampere has reacted positively to the activities of the association. Villi Vyöhyke has established over fifty guerilla meadows in the city of Tampere. The association operates mainly in the Pirkanmaa region.

=== New Zealand ===
==== Vacant lot of cabbages ====
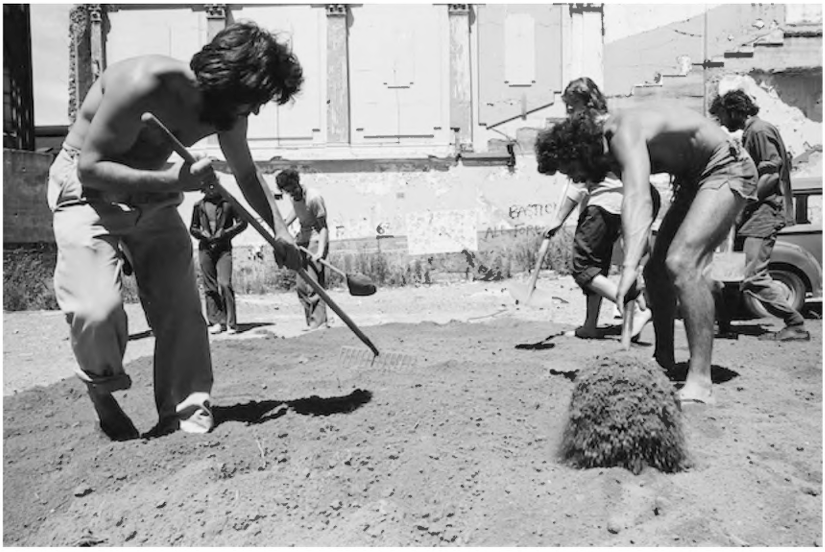
Barry Thomas and Hugh Walton with team raking out topsoil delivered to site 4 January 1978. The soil cost Thomas $34 and 150 cabbage seedlings are about to be planted in the form of the word CABBAGE. Vacant Lot of Cabbages was not only an early guerilla garden it was a deliberate work of Duchampian inspired interventionist art. Photo Justin Keen.

In 1978 downtown Wellington, a group of New Zealand artists, including Chris Lipscombe, Barry Thomas, Hugh Walton and others, planted 180 cabbages "on the demolished Duke of Edinburgh/Roxy Theatre site in the centre of Wellington. This cabbage patch, planted in such a way as to spell the word CABBAGE". The project culminated in a week-long festival when the cabbages were harvested. While a work of conceptual sculpture, this intervention is also an early example of guerrilla gardening in New Zealand. The work remained for six months. Christina Barton writes that in the months that followed, "it captured the hearts and minds of Wellingtonians, who followed the growth of the cabbages, adding their own embellishments to the site, and contributed to the week of festivities (with poetry readings, performances, and the distribution of free coleslaw) that celebrated their harvest", describing the work as "a provocation to the local council and the city's developers".

=== Poland ===
==== Urban Guerilla Gardening ====
An informal group founded by Witold Szwedkowski, "Miejska Partyzantka Ogrodnicza", has been operating in Poland since 2005. In 2010, they started running the "Shelter for Unwanted Plants". In 2017, they established the "World Day of Planting Pumpkins in Public Places" (May 16) and, from 2020, the "National Suspension of Lawn Mowers", a campaign to reduce the frequency of mowing the city.

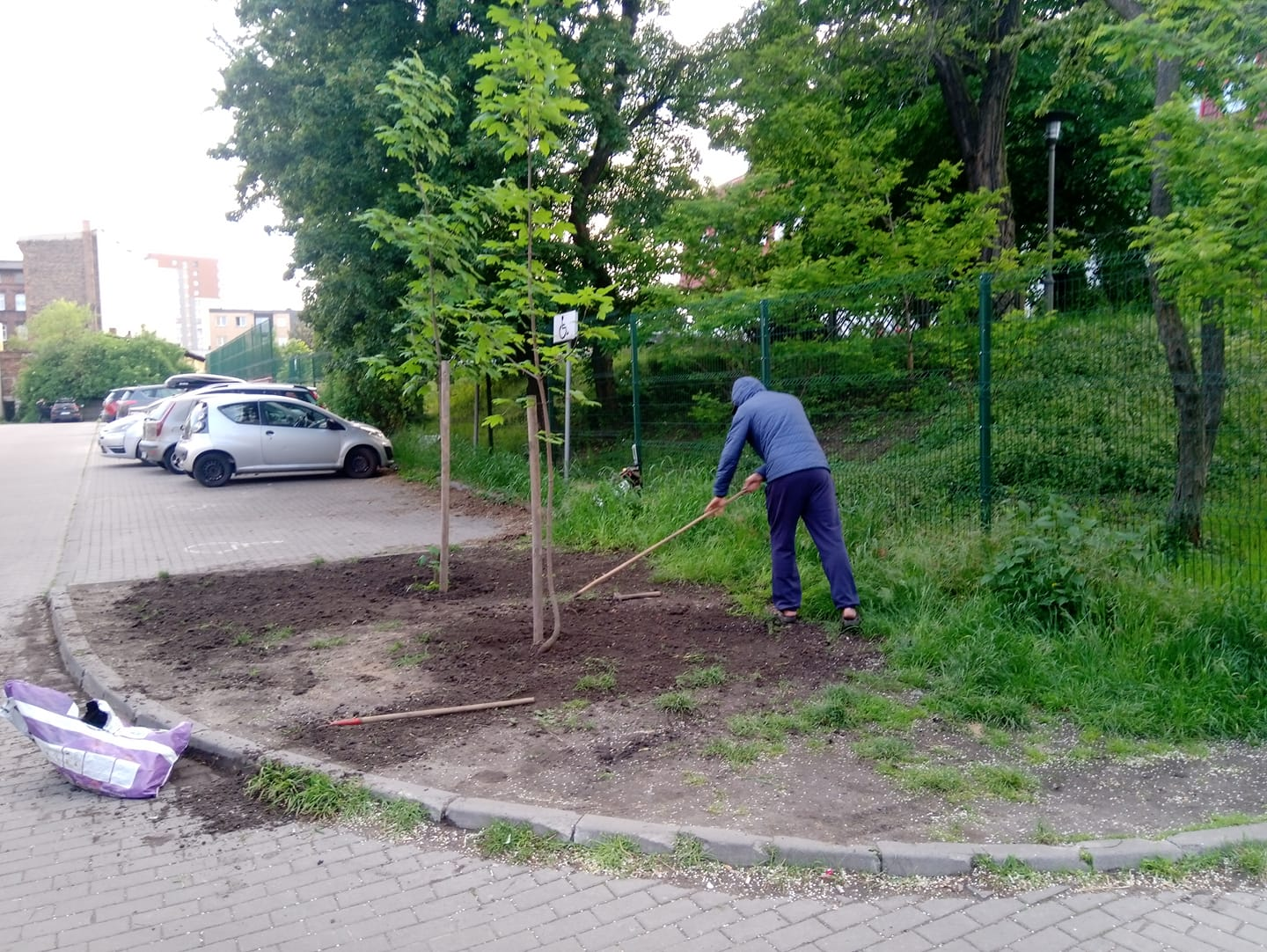
One of the actions of the Urban Guerilla Gardening; two sycamore maples are planted at the site of an illegal car park.

=== South Korea ===
Guerrilla gardening in South Korea is organized and carried out by individuals, volunteer groups and Internet communities. In August 2012 Richard Reynolds visited South Korea and spoke to many Korean audiences about guerrilla gardening through TEDxItaewon.

=== United Kingdom ===
==== GuerrillaGardening.org ====
GuerrillaGardening.org was created in October 2004 by Richard Reynolds as a blog of his solo guerrilla gardening outside Perronet House, a council block in London's Elephant and Castle district. At the time, his motivations were simply those of a frustrated gardener looking to beautify the neighborhood, but his website attracted the interest of fellow guerrilla gardeners in London and beyond, as well as the world's media. Reynolds's guerrilla gardening has now reached many pockets of South London, and news of his activity has inspired people around the world to get involved. He also works alongside other troops, some local and some who travel, to participate. He has also guerrilla gardened in Libya, Berlin and Montreal.

GuerrillaGardening.org evolved from a blog into a wider website, offering tips and a forum (though this has fallen out of use, and is now largely inactive). His book, On Guerrilla Gardening, which describes and discusses activity in 30 different countries, was published by Bloomsbury Publishing in the UK and USA in May 2008, in Germany in 2009, France in 2010 and South Korea in 2012. Reynolds himself is now less vocally active, but still guerrilla gardens with his children in Totnes.

==== Leaf Street Community Garden, Manchester ====
Leaf Street is an acre of land in Hulme, Manchester, England, that was once an urban street until turfed over by Manchester City Council. Local people, facilitated by Manchester Permaculture Group, took direct action in turning the site into a thriving community garden.

=== United States ===
==== California ====
In 1974, the artist Bonnie Sherk founded The Farm as a work of urban gardening, performance art and environmental sculpture in San Francisco. The Farm grew edible crops and livestock, and later became a community center that operated until 1987.

In 2008, Scott Bunnell started the SOCAL Guerrilla Gardening Club, adding more drought tolerant gardens, and creating several gardens in Eagle Rock, Pico Rivera, Whittier, Long Beach, Norwalk, Artesia, Venice, Los Angeles County, and the Hollywood and Skid Row areas of Los Angeles. In 2015, SoCal Guerrilla Gardening Club also planted a guerrilla "satellite" garden in Morro Bay with their sister club, the MBGGC.

Greenaid, a Los Angeles-based organization founded in 2010 by Daniel Phillips and Kim Karlsrud of Common Studio, converts vintage gumball machines to dispense seed balls (a combination of clay, compost, and region-specific seeds). Seed balls are then used for seed bombing, where they are tossed or planted in any area that may benefit from wildflowers. Greenaid partners with business owners, educators and citizens to distribute seedbomb vending machines in various communities worldwide. With region-specific seedbomb mixes, Greenaid aims to integrate and beautify (rather than disrupt) traditionally bland urban areas such as sidewalks and highway medians.

At the Los Angeles Green Grounds, designer Ron Finley started growing produce on a strip of parkway lawn, but came into conflict with the city council. He was successful in maintaining this urban market garden and has promoted the idea in a TED talk and appearances at international conferences, such as the Stockholm Food Forum and MAD in Copenhagen.

==== Minnesota ====
In the Minneapolis–Saint Paul metropolitan area during the 2010s and 2020s, activists installed gardens where people had been killed by law enforcement or during demonstrations. Gardens emerged for Jamar Clark, Philando Castile, George Floyd, Daunte Wright, Winston Boogie Smith, and Deona Knajdek. The mission of those installing and tending the gardens was to promote healing and racial justice.

==== New York ====
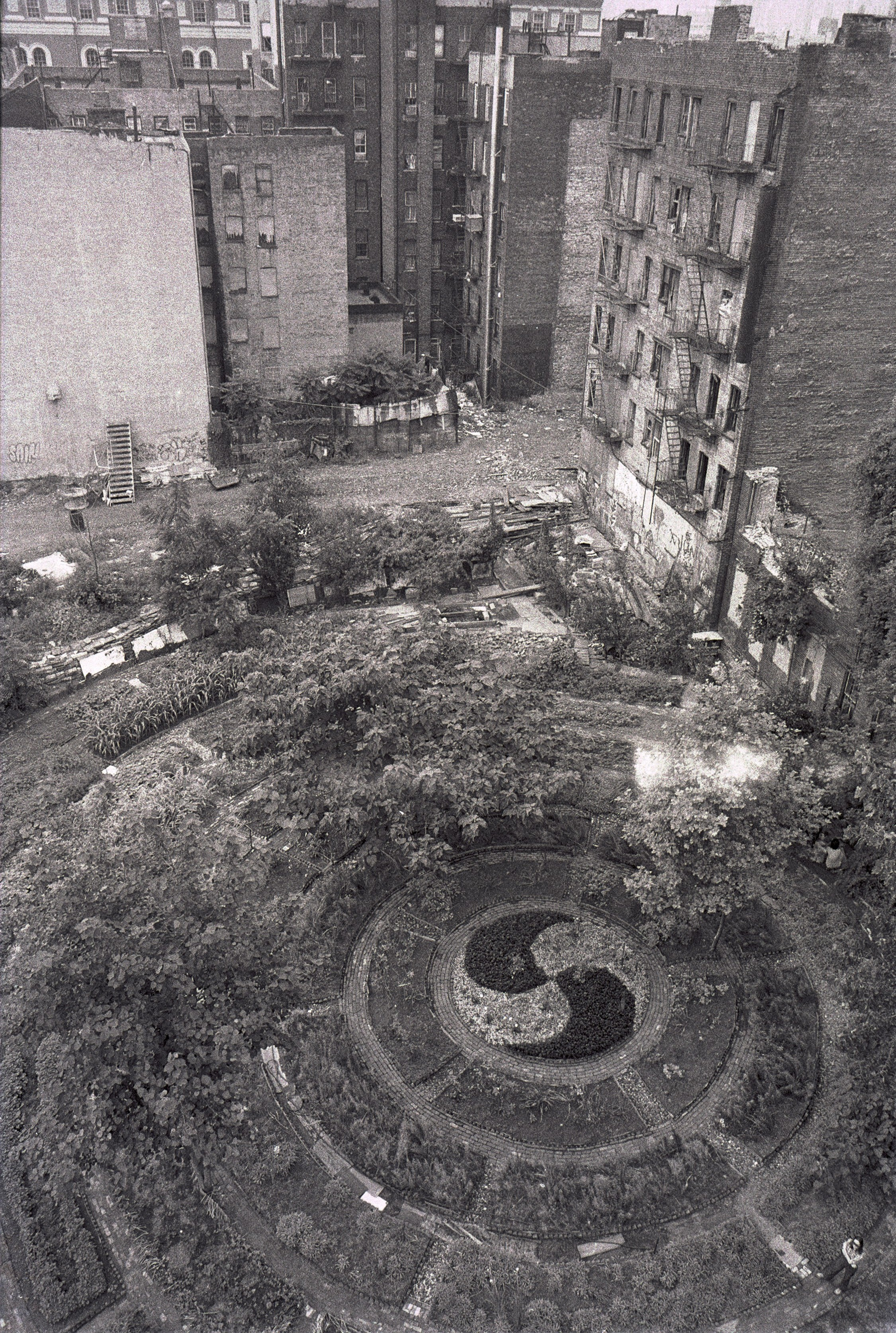
Adam Purple's urban garden on the Lower East Side of Manhattan in 1984

From the mid-1970s, Adam Purple created and tended a circular garden (shaped like a yin-yang) on the Lower East Side of Manhattan, in an abandoned lot. In 1986, when it was bulldozed by the City of New York, the garden had overtaken many lots and reached a size of 15,000 square feet. The short film Adam Purple and the Garden of Eden tells its history.

==== Ohio ====
In 2022, three Cleveland, Ohio residents planted a small flower bed in a Euclid Avenue sidewalk hole. The hole sat in the middle of Cleveland's main downtown avenue, causing safety and aesthetic concerns. The flower bed was a simple arrangement of flowers with a white picket fence surrounding it. The sidewalk hole has since been repaired.

==== Washington ====
In 1975, an early guerrilla gardening action was staged at Naval Submarine Base Bangor; activists planted a vegetable garden and sowed wheat on base land.

On April 7, 2001, Cascade Neighborhood Council in Seattle commissioned a sculpture created by Paul Kuniholm to be occupy a vacant space adjacent to the right-of-way in a safe and beneficial installation.

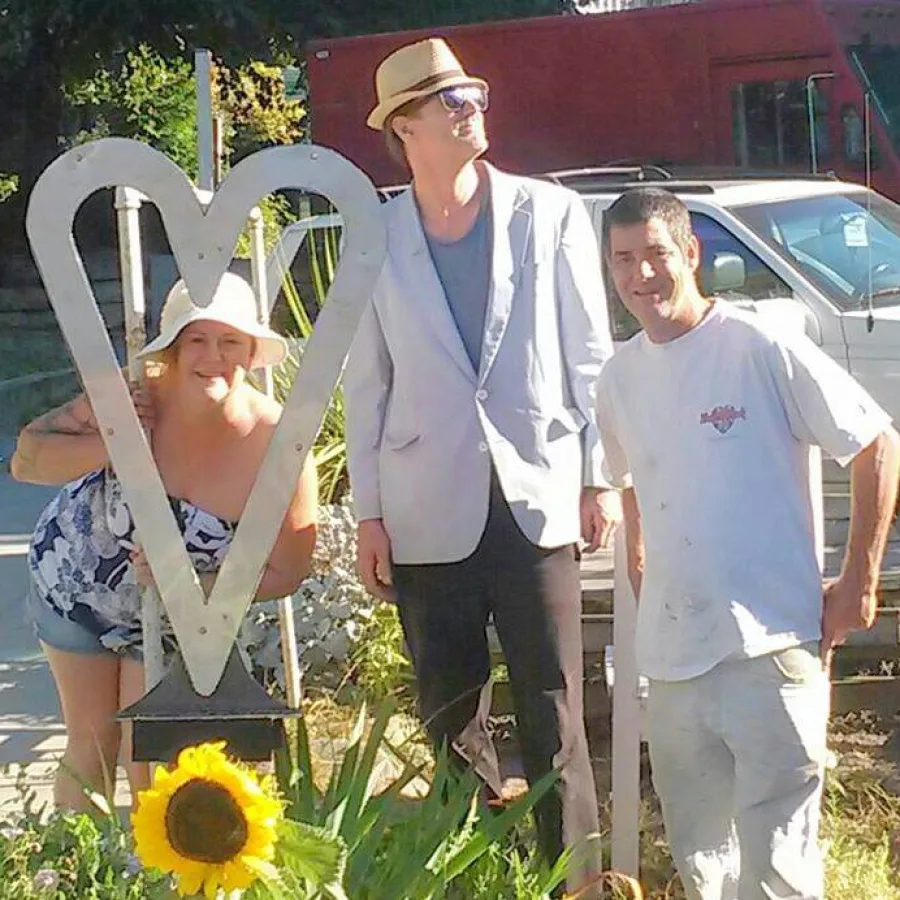
Cascade Peoples Center Tactical Urbanism, maximizing under-utilized space in Seattle, posed here are, from left, Candi Wilvang, Paul Kuniholm and Kim Johnson. Paul Kuniholm created the sculpture, titled: Stainless Heart Four.

== See also ==
- Community gardening
- Community Supported Agriculture
- Flower power
- Food Justice
- Horticultural therapy
- Proplifting
- The Man Who Planted Trees
- Victory garden
- World Naked Gardening Day
  - Gardens Everywhere Bike Parade

General:

- Common land
- Communal garden
- Tactical urbanism
- Urban horticulture
