= Precision seeding =

In agriculture, precision seeding is a method of seeding that involves placing seed at a precise spacing and depth. This is in contrast to broadcast seeding, where seed is scattered over an area.

Although precise hand placement would qualify, precision seeding usually refers to a mechanical process. A wide range of hand-push and powered precision seeders are available for small- to large-scale jobs. Using a variety of actions, they all open the soil, place the seed, then cover it, to create rows. There are also precision seeders for planting flats of seeds for indoor seed starting. The depth and spacing is generally adjustable to accommodate a range of crops and the desired plant density; the degree of adjustability depends upon the chosen seeder.

In commercial production, precision seeding is an alternative to placing larger quantities of seed in a row, by dribbling seed or setting several seeds in each position. Depending on the device, precision seeders may place only one, or a very few seeds per position. This is an advantage, in that it saves seed and it avoids crowding, or the need for thinning, allowing plants the space to grow efficiently. On the downside, by placing fewer seeds, a very high germination rate is required to make full use of the seeded area.

== See also ==
- Precision farming
