= Ron Finley =

South Central LA urban gardener and American fashion designer

- Occupations: Fashion designer Urban gardener
- Known for: Guerilla gardening
- Website: ronfinley.com

Ron Finley is a Los Angeles-based fashion designer to professional athletes, collector of original blaxploitation posters, and proponent of urban gardening. He is known for giving a widely-viewed TED talk on guerilla gardening.

== Career ==
Finley began his career by creating his first collection called the Dropdead Collexion in his own garage. It ended up being popular with commonly known and high-end stores such as Saks Fifth Avenue, Nordstrom, and Neiman Marcus. Celebrities soon became attracted to his original ideas and designs. Ron Finley also collects memorabilia of Black entertainment which has allowed him to own a collection of his own preservation of history. His collection includes movie posters that enable the audience to see the progression of Black people in the movie industry.

Finley's poster collection was featured in Miramax's book on the era, What It Is, What It Was.

== Urban farming ==
In 2010, Finley dug up a strip of land between his house and the street and started planting fruits and vegetables. It was illegal to plant these on the land between the sidewalk and curb but he got the city of Los Angeles to change the law. The “Residential Parkway Landscaping Guidelines” were changed to end fines for vegetable gardens within the strip owned by the city.

In early 2013, Finley gave a TED talk on his progress as a "guerrilla gardener", the dangers of food deserts, and the potential for his program to improve quality of life. He said in the talk, "If kids grow kale, kids eat kale; if they grow tomatoes, they eat tomatoes." The talk has received over three million views on the TED web site, and attracted attention from numerous celebrities and collaboration proposals from corporations.

After his TED talk, Finley developed a gardening training facility under the name of The Ron Finley Project in South Central Los Angeles. His guerilla gardening efforts have had modest success in persuading city officials to cooperate, but remain officially illegal under city code. In 2016, The Ron Finley Project was told they had to buy the property hosting their garden for $500,000, or it would be shut down. A fundraising campaign ensued. The campaign got the attention of natural food companies, and the original $500,000 goal was surpassed.

Finley has appeared in several documentary films about urban farming, including Urban Fruit and Can You Dig This.

Finley refers to himself as a "gangsta gardener" explaining, "Gardening is gangsta. Drugs, robbing—that's not gangsta. Building community—that's gangsta. I'm changing the vernacular."

Finley is the teacher in a masterclass that came out on Earth Day of 2020, April 22. Amidst the coronavirus pandemic, his class for home-growing food was “one of the most popular” according to David Schrieber, chief marketing officer for masterclass.

Ron Finley created initially started gardening to decrease the effects of the food apartheid in which his own neighborhood existed, encourage healthy eating habits, and beautify the land. Finley encourages people of all backgrounds – not just the poor – to grow their own food. He is a self titled “ecolutionary — someone who gives a f— about this planet and is fighting for it.” He believes that “health is not just what you eat. It’s what you see, what you smell, what you feel.”

== Personal life ==
Finley grew up in South Los Angeles, with seven siblings. He has three sons.
