= World Naked Gardening Day =

Annual event to promote gardening while naked

- Status: Active since 2005
- Genre: Annual naturism/nudism, gardening, guerilla gardening, permaculture event
- Date: First Saturday of May
- Frequency: Annually, first Saturday of May
- Location: International
- Inaugurated: Saturday, September 10, 2005
- Founder: Jacob Gabriel, Liz Miller, and Mark Storey
- Most recent: Saturday, May 3, 2025
- Next event: Saturday, May 2, 2026
- Organiser: Body Freedom Collaborative
- Website: http://www.WNGD.net

World Naked Gardening Day (WNGD) is an annual international event generally celebrated on the first Saturday of May by gardeners and non-gardeners alike.

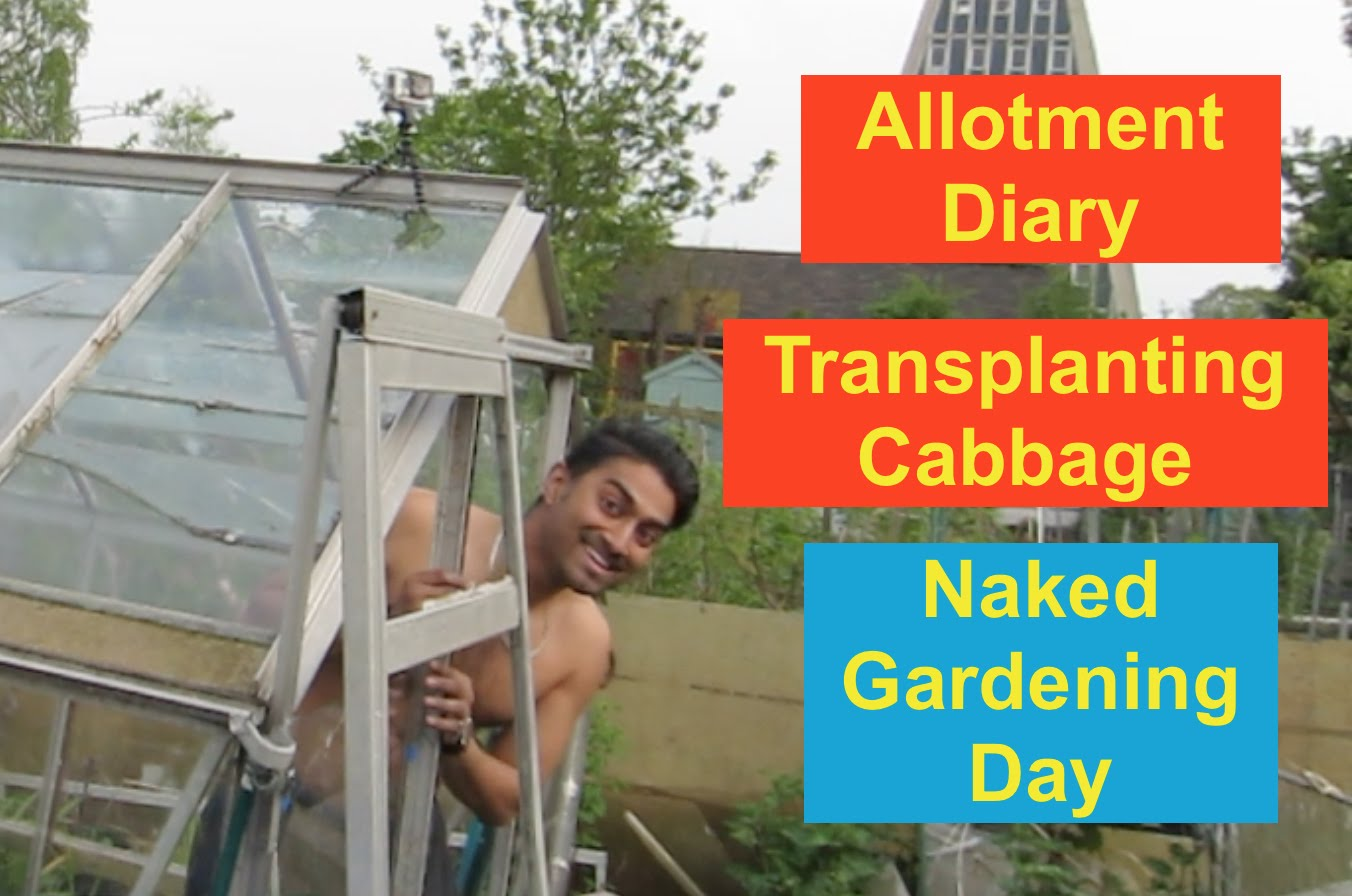
A graphic for a gardening video celebrating World Naked Gardening Day in 2016

== Organization ==
WNGD was founded and organized by Mark Storey (consulting editor for Nude & Natural magazine) and permaculturalist Jacob Gabriel, as a project of Body Freedom Collaborative (BFC). In its early days, Storey had a vision of BFC engaging in "guerrilla pranksterism" such as hopping out of a van or showing up spontaneously in an urban environment and engaging in guerilla gardening.

In the New York Daily News, Storey noted that WNGD is not owned by any one organization. "No particular organization owns World Naked Gardening Day," Storey said, "and it's not actually one large gathering of horticulturists in Seattle who strip down and shear some shrubs together."

While the phenomenon quickly spread internationally, little investment has been made by its founders. "Storey said he and Johnson haven't spent any money or gone to any great lengths to promote World Naked Gardening Day since they initiated it. They helped create a website early on, and then receded into the background. They intended that the idea of an introduction to clothes freedom through gardening was valuable and would grow organically on its own."

WNGD is endorsed by The Naturist Society, Clothes Free International and American Association for Nude Recreation (AANR), among others. As of 2012, Storey is the project lead of WNGD. WNGD is currently a collaborative project of the Naturist Education Foundation, Inc.

The first annual World Naked Gardening Day took place on September 10, 2005. In 2007, the event date was moved to the first Saturday in May; as of 2018, the event still takes place on the first Saturday in May. In 2018, however, the New Zealand Naturist Federation adopted the last weekend in October as World Naked Gardening Day; this date was deemed to be better suited to the climate of the Southern Hemisphere. In Canada, the first Saturday in May can be pretty cool for naked gardening so an alternative date of the first Saturday in June was suggested as the Naked Canadian Gardening Day.

== Motivation ==
According to NBC's Today, WNGD "has become an annual tradition that celebrates weeding, planting flowers and trimming hedges in the buff. While it is linked to a movement of nudists who promote wholesome and unashamed acceptance of the human body, the day is meant to be funny, lighthearted and non-political, founders say."

Organizers assert that "besides being liberating, nude gardening is second only to swimming as an activity that people are most ready to consider doing nude".

Beyond body positivity, Corky Stanton of Clothes Free International, an organization that promotes nude recreation, has asserted that the event offers the "fringe benefits of bare, unabashed recreation: the satisfaction of exercising in the great outdoors; the attractiveness of an all-over tan; more Vitamin D on your whole body; the unbeatable experience of skinny-dipping if the naturist event involves a beach or a lake."

== Private vs. public observance ==
While the event is most often celebrated in secluded areas, BFC first kicked off the event with its trademark "guerrilla pranksterism" and did a photo shoot in a public park. In another year, Storey and Gabriel enlisted the help of local free beach users at an unofficial clothing-optional beach park on Lake Washington, in Seattle. Many people choose not to venture beyond the relative safety of non-public areas. During the fifth annual World Naked Gardening Day in the United Kingdom, celebrated in 2010, organizers encouraged people to go naked either in their private gardens or in public parks.

== Media attention ==
Since the launch of WNGD, its popularity has grown. In 2021, the Orlando Weekly reported that a survey listed Orlando in the "Top 10" places to celebrate World Naked Gardening Day. Other cities included Austin, Seattle, Atlanta, and Portland, Oregon.

== See also ==
- Abbey House Gardens
- Naturism
- Social nudity in Seattle
