= Green Guerillas =

Guerilla gardening group from the 1970s

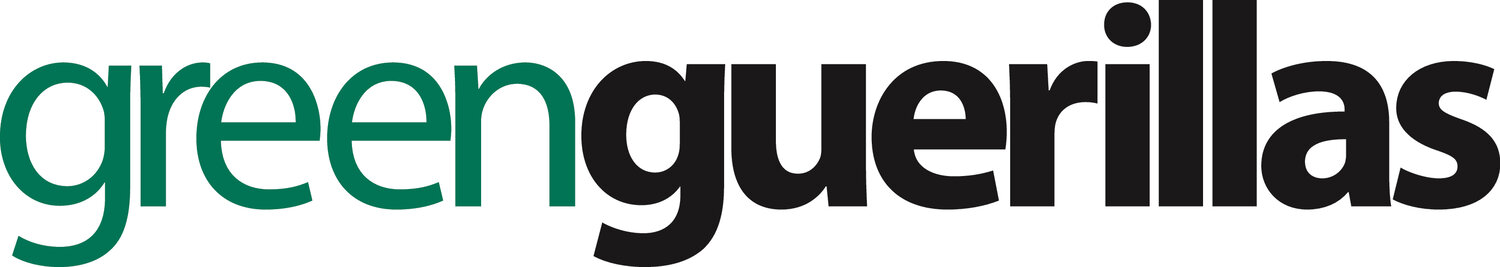
Logo of the Green Guerillas

The Green Guerillas are a community group of horticulturalists, gardeners, botanists, and planners who work to turn abandoned or empty spaces in New York City into gardens. Formed in the 1970s, the group threw "seed grenades" into derelict lots and developed community gardens, often without going through official channels. It became especially popular after the concerted redevelopment of a dangerous, trash-filled space at the corner of Houston Street and Bowery in Manhattan. The resulting press coverage and word of mouth led the group to broaden its activities from active gardening to education, training, and support for a number of community groups working on their own gardens. The Green Guerillas have been credited with beginning the community garden movement and popularizing the idea of guerilla gardening.

== Early activities ==
A 1973 Green Guerillas flyer with instructions on how to create "seed grenades"

Amid a financial crisis in the 1970s, several areas of New York City, like the Lower East Side of Manhattan, were particularly affected by disinvestment and saw an associated increase in abandoned buildings, some of which attracted crime. Many were demolished, and the number of vacant lots increased. Many remained abandoned for extended periods of time, either attracting garbage and vandalism or becoming fenced off and unavailable for use by communities. Local resident Liz Christy co-founded a group called the Green Guerillas in the early 1970s, intent on transforming derelict lots into gardens. Group members met on a regular basis to identify spaces, strategize, and discuss horticulture.

Responding to the tendency of many lots to be fenced off, the group became known for their use of what they called "seed grenades" (or "green-aides"), a mix of seeds, fertilizer, water, and a substrate stuffed into a receptacle like a glass Christmas tree ornament, balloon, or condom. Guerillas would lob the grenades over fences, with the hope that, after shattering, the seeds would take root, introducing plants and flowers to an ugly lot. According to Malve von Hassell, the seed bombs had an important symbolic meaning relevant to the group name's inspiration by militant radicals. The grenades were thrown into abandoned spaces "to start a literal grassroots revolution", blurring the lines between plant, tool, and weapon.

== Bowery Houston Community Farm and Garden ==
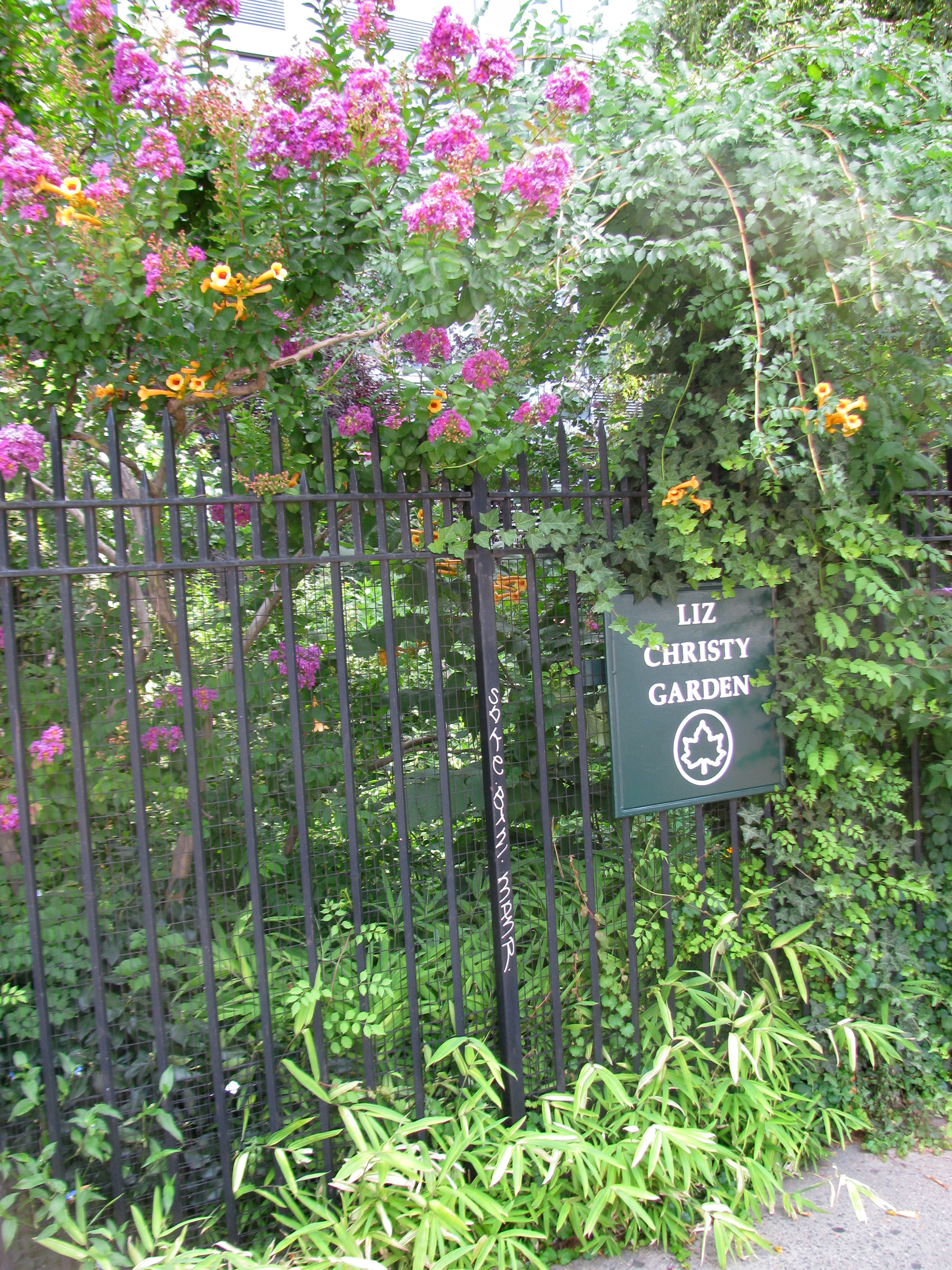
Bowery Houston Community Farm and Garden, renamed the Liz Christy Garden in 1985, in 2012

Christy worked for an architect-planner who considered turning a vacant lot at the corner of Houston Street and Bowery into a farm, restoring the purpose it served in colonial times, in celebration of the United States Bicentennial. She expressed in an interview that she found the lot depressing, recalling that "[i]n the past few years I've seen three different men carried out of there dead, from alcohol or exposure or whatever. And children played in there with all that glass and filth." Though her employer died before work started, Christy went forward with the plan in 1973. She advertised a garden meeting, posting signs around the neighborhood in multiple languages, and recruited volunteers to both work on the space and to raise funds for equipment, supplies, fencing, and insurance. After the city denied the group permission to work on the project, they proceeded outside of official channels. Members of the community removed the accumulated trash, hauled in soil, and developed the space into lots for vegetable gardens.

After working through the spring, they opened the first handful of plots for planting in May 1974. As work continued and interest grew, volunteers tried to convert as much of the space as possible into gardening plots. That year, they secured a $1 per month lease from the Office of Housing Preservation and Development under the name "Bowery Houston Community Farm and Garden". A 1974 New York Daily News article about the garden said that "they have not only brightened up the corner with flowers and greenery, but have also provided many low-income families in the area with their own fresh produce all summer". Christy was especially happy with the interest children showed in the garden.

That garden, the first and oldest recognized community garden in New York City, grew to be over an acre and remains active as of 2021, and was renamed the Liz Christy Garden after her death in 1985. The Green Guerillas went on to turn other derelict lots into gardens, working on 16 spaces in 1974 and 84 in 1975. A New York Times article about the group in 1976 reported that they received $356 in donations in their first three years, with $3,500 in expenses, paid out of volunteers' pockets.

== Growth and community organizing ==
In response to growing interest from other communities, the Green Guerillas began developing informational materials for communities who wanted to do the same. They ran workshops, offered to survey sites, made recommendations, and sometimes secured donated plants and trees. The organizational and support functions of the group grew considerably over the years, running workshops on pruning trees, cultivating wildflower meadows, rooftop gardening, and construction of a pond. In addition to teaching communities about plants, the Green Guerillas taught how to design a garden, how to develop operational procedures, and how to interact with the city. They treated gardeners as neighborhood leaders and required every project to involve a local community for the long-term viability of the gardens, rather than a small number of individuals.

Though communities did not always secure the necessary permissions and paperwork, the city benefitted from the Green Guerillas and other community gardening projects as no-cost revitalization. In 1978, the city created an agency, Operation Green Thumb, dedicated to promoting and assisting with community-managed gardens and other projects utilizing open space. Among its activities is helping to secure leases for vacant land. That program, which was moved into the New York City Department of Parks and Recreation in 1995, is still active as of 2021.

In 1983, Green Guerillas logged 13,400 volunteer hours and had a budget of more than $40,000, which largely went to its two paid staff members, an executive director and her assistant. They ran a contest for window boxes, promoting the installation of window-hanging gardens and offering education on their construction, installation, and cultivation. In 1984, the Green Guerillas distributed a newsletter, worked with more than a hundred community groups, helped them to strategize and organize, provided information about plants and garden design, and donated tens of thousands of dollars in plants, according to the Christian Science Monitor. In 1986, the year after Christy's death, the organization had 250 volunteers with an annual budget of around $82,000, which it received from donations, as well as from foundations, corporations, and state government. In addition to community gardens, the group assists senior centers, homeless shelters, schools, and other organizations. For example, they worked with homeless men at the Charles H. Gay Shelter on Wards Island to develop an accessible garden. One of their major activities remained the collection and reuse of plants, securing donations of plants as well as bulbs, seeds, soil, pots, and tolls from farms, gardens, and other nonprofits and businesses in the region. The group would hold giveaway events from the Bowery–Houston Garden, notifying community gardens in the area that resources will be available for pick-up. As of 1991, 450 of the approximately 700 community gardens in the city were affiliated with the Green Guerillas.

Helping communities work with city agencies to secure leases and otherwise ensure the persistence of the gardens has long been an important part of the Green Guerillas' activities. A 1991 Newsday article described the organization's evolution since its early days: "Once, Green Guerillas worked against the system, outsiders fighting layers of bureaucracy to green up some of the starkest of cityscapes. Now they work the system". The leases the city typically used for the gardens allowed them to be removed at any time, with thirty days' notice, and ninety gardens were destroyed in the city between 1984 and 1999. Most of those were under the Rudy Giuliani administration. As mayor, he prioritized the privatization and development of public land. In January 1999 alone, 114 sites where gardens existed were put forward for auction. In response, the Guerillas produced materials focusing on the financial cost of such a sale, which would mean loss of a variety of community services, as well as the detrimental impact on quality of life in affected neighborhoods. Along with three members of the New York City Council and multiple community boards, the Guerillas filed a lawsuit against the Giuliani administration for failing to undergo required state reviews under the Uniform Land Use Review Procedure and State Environmental Quality Review Act. The suit persisted into the Bloomberg administration and was rejected by the State Supreme Court in 2002. In the interim, entertainer Bette Midler purchased some of the lots and another lawsuit was filed by State Attorney General Eliot Spitzer, arguing the intended auction was not legal under New York's environmental laws. That case, which ended in September 2002, resulted in the preservation of about 500 gardens and plans to turn other lots into housing.

== Legacy ==
While urban farming was not a new phenomenon, the grassroots reclamation of abandoned, derelict lots for gardens proved a popular concept. The Green Guerillas have been credited with beginning the community garden movement and popularizing the idea of guerilla gardening, which became an international practice. In an article for Nature and Culture, Colette Palamar used the Green Guerillas as a case study at the intersection of ecological restoration and environmental justice, showing that "it is possible for communities to see and understand their own needs, as well as develop the expertise necessary for at least some kinds of ecological restoration projects".
