= Seed ball =

Human-made ball of clay with seeds inside

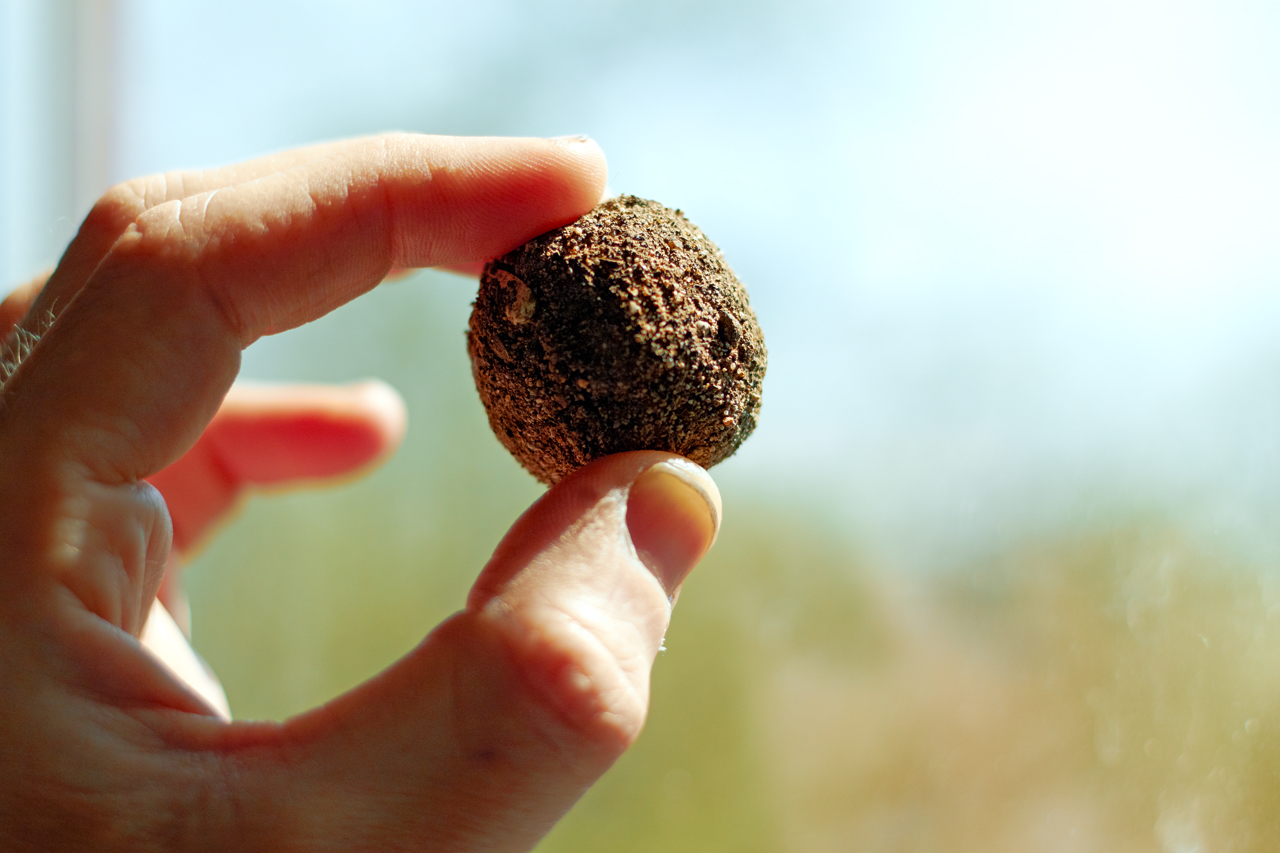
A seed ball

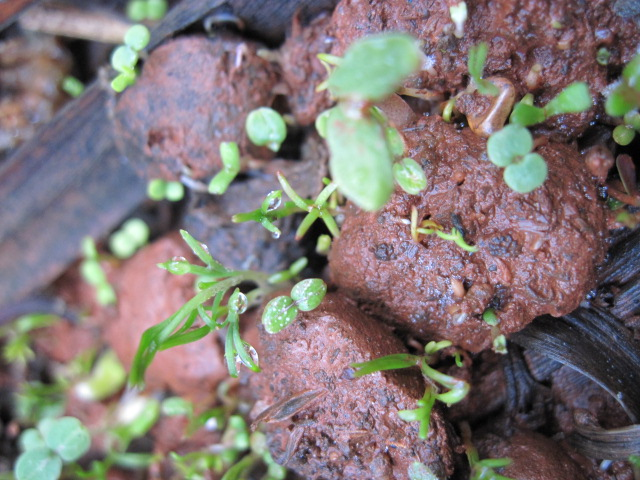
Plants sprouting from seed balls

Seed balls, also known as earth balls or nendo dango (Japanese: 粘土団子), consist of seeds rolled within a ball of clay and other matter to assist germination. They are then thrown into vacant lots and over fences as a form of guerilla gardening. Matter such as humus and compost are often placed around the seeds to provide microbial inoculants. Cotton-fibres or liquefied paper are sometimes added to further protect the clay ball in particularly harsh habitats. An ancient technique, it was re-discovered by Japanese natural farming pioneer Masanobu Fukuoka.

== History ==
The technique was used in ancient Egypt to repair farms after the annual spring flooding of the Nile.

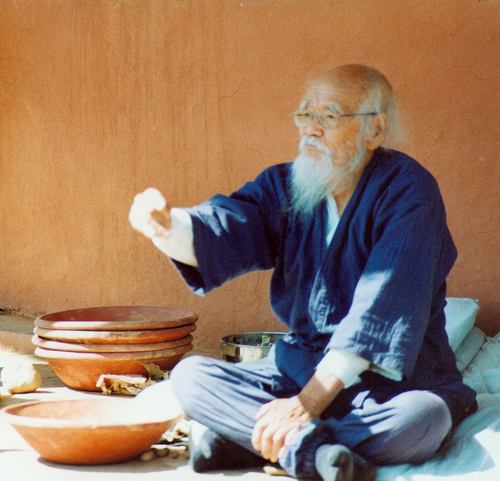
Masanobu Fukuoka, throwing the first seedball at the workshop at Navdanya, in October 2002

The technique for creating seed balls was rediscovered by Japanese natural farming pioneer Masanobu Fukuoka. Fukuoka developed his technique during the period of the Second World War, while working in a Japanese government lab as a plant scientist on the mountainous island of Shikoku. He wanted to find a technique that would increase food production without taking away from the land already allocated for traditional rice production.

In 1973 in New York, Liz Christy, co-founder of the Green Guerillas, developed seed bombs she called "seed green-aide". The first seed green-aides were made from condoms filled with tomato seeds, and fertilizer. They were tossed over fences onto empty lots in New York City in order to make the neighborhoods look better. It was the start of the guerrilla gardening movement.

== Construction ==
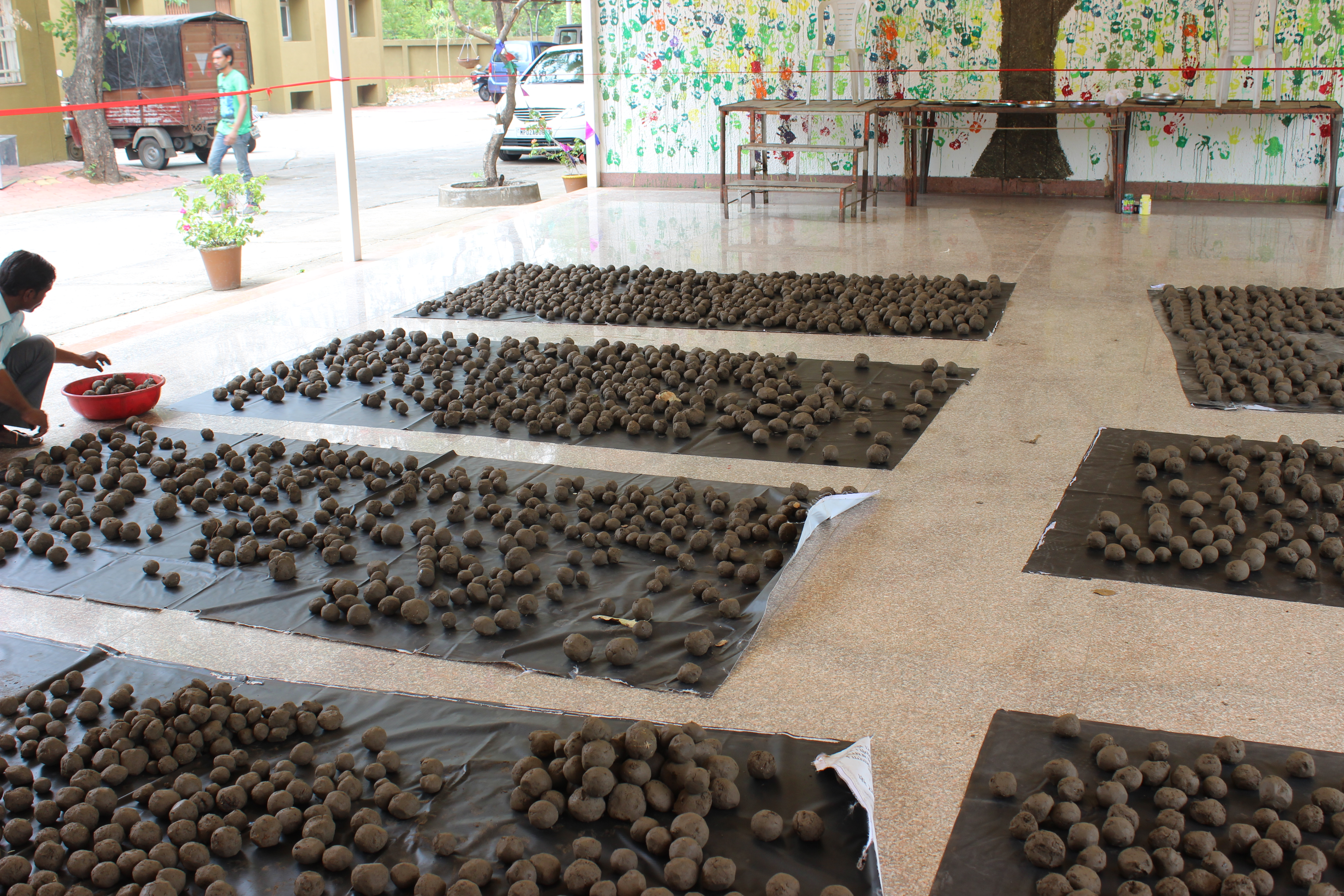
Drying seed balls

To make a seed ball, generally about five measures of red clay by volume are combined with one measure of seeds. The balls are formed between 10 mm and 80 mm (about 1/2" to 3") in diameter. After the seed balls have been formed, they must dry for 24–48 hours before use.

== Seed bombing ==
Seed bombing is the practice of introducing vegetation to land by throwing or dropping seed balls. It is used in modern aerial seeding as a way to deter seed predation. It has also been popularized by green movements such as guerrilla gardening as a way to introduce new plants to an environment.

== See also ==
- The One-Straw Revolution
- Miss Rumphius by Barbara Cooney, a 1982 children's book emphasizing public seed scattering
- Seed dispersal
- Johnny Appleseed
- Diggers
