= En Tibi Herbarium =

16th-century herbarium

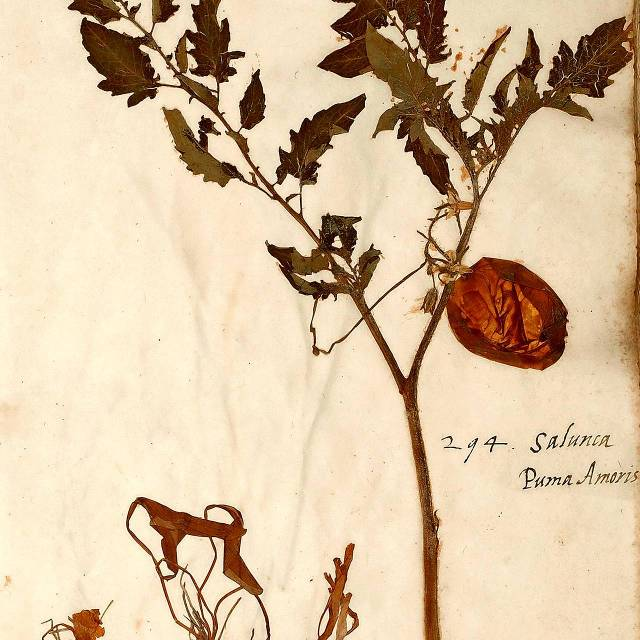
The second oldest surviving tomato fruit and leaves, preserved in the En Tibi Herbarium

En Tibi herbarium, short for En tibi perpetuis ridentem floribus hortum (Here for you a smiling garden of everlasting flowers) is a 16th-century herbarium. It contains 473 dried plant specimens, belonging to 455 species and subspecies and 97 families, and is one of the largest and oldest known of its kind. A fine leather binding, blind and gold embossed ornamentation, and gilt and gauffered edges are all features of the large 42 x 29 cm book. The characteristics of the paper and the consistent anvil-and-hammer watermark indicate that all the sheets are from a single source. A valuable and costly 16th-century object, its full provenance is unknown; its earliest possessor was the Habsburg Emperor Emperor Rudolph II in the 1500s. The book is currently held in the treasure room of the Naturalis Biodiversity Center in Leiden.

== History ==
In 1992, in a paper published in Italian, Sergio Toresella, an expert on medieval herbals, proposed that the herbarium was made in Ferrara in 1542–1544. This hypothesis was rejected by a multidisciplinary team in 2019. This team established that the En Tibi herbarium was made in Bologna around 1558. The herbarium was attributed to Francesco Petrollini, a neglected 16th century botanist, to whom the Cibo Herbarium was also attributed. The En Tibi was probably a work on commission for Petrollini, who provided the plant material for the book. Other people were apparently involved in the compilation and offering of the work to an as yet unknown person, possibly as a gift to the Habsburg Emperor Ferdinand I. Described by Anastasia Stefanaki as "It's like having a painting by Leonardo da Vinci and not knowing that it's he who made it". The earliest possessor of the herbarium is recognized as the Habsburg Emperor Rudolph II in the 1500s.

== Content ==
The En Tibi herbarium was supposed to contain 500 specimens. However, several pages are missing or have been cut out, one plant was never glued on the corresponding sheet and was subsequently lost, and several mistakes were made in the numbering of plants, leading to a reduction of the actual number of specimens preserved in the book to 473. The plants in the herbarium belong to 97 families and 455 species and subspecies.

435 of the En Tibi specimens are angiosperms, five are gymnosperms, 13 are pteridophytes, four are bryophytes and two are lichens. The plant specimens do not follow a clear order in the book, but the intention was most probably to have an alphabetical arrangement, which is currently interrupted by plants that may have been added at a later stage.

=== Hair analysis ===
Eight hairs were found underneath plant specimens. DNA profiling tests were carried out using two hypervariable mtDNA regions. Four hairs were found to belong to four different individuals.

=== Handwriting analysis ===
The attribution of the En Tibi and Cibo Herbaria to Francesco Petrollini was mainly accomplished through handwriting analysis.
