= Aerial seeding =

Sowing seeds through aerial machinery

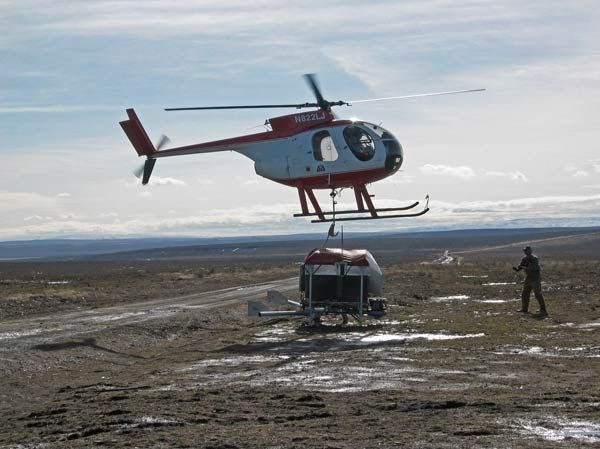
Aerial seeding helicopter

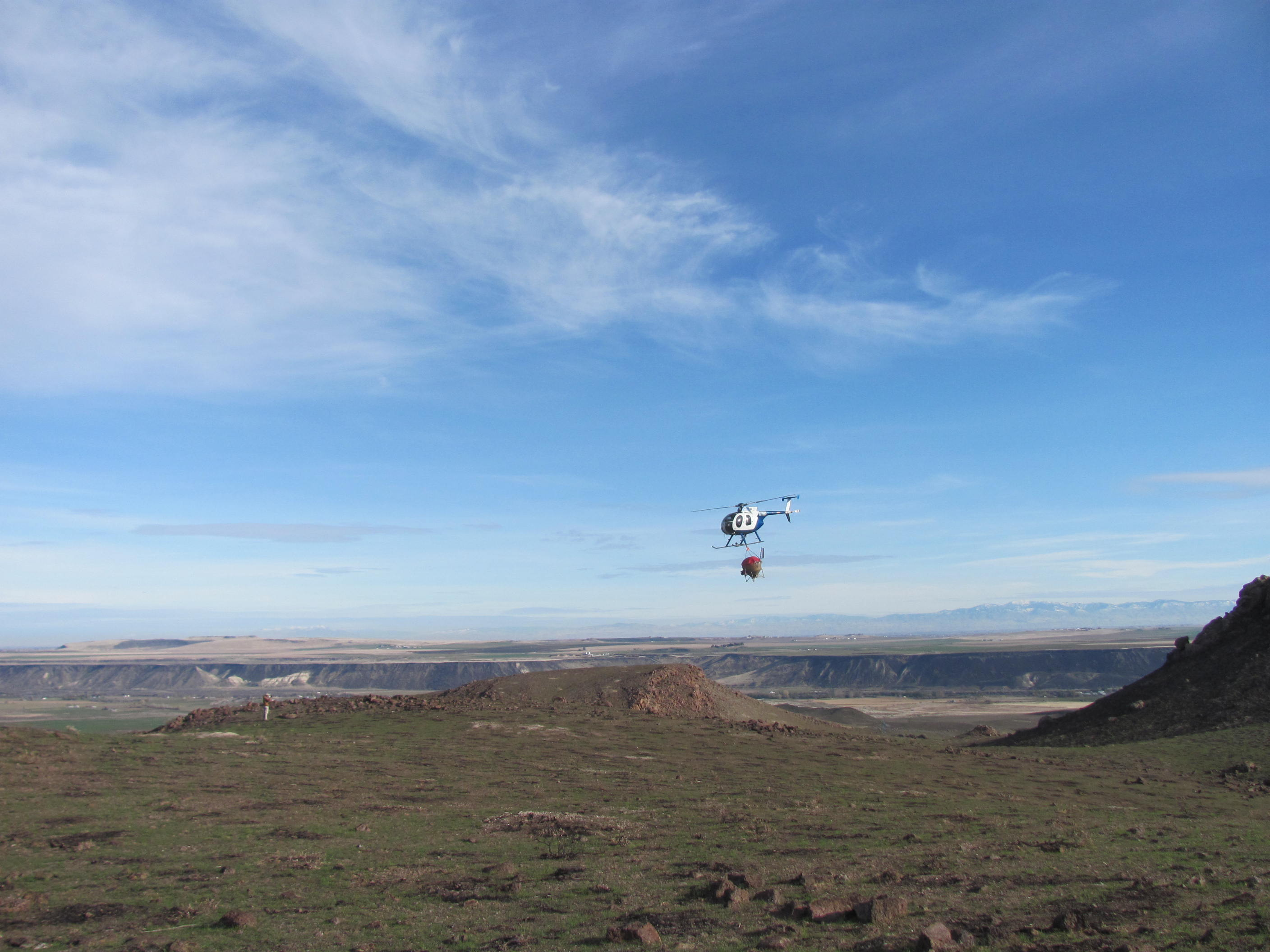
Aerial seeding from a Hughes 500 helicopter

Aerial seeding is a technique of sowing seeds by spraying them through aerial mechanical means such as a drone, plane or helicopter. When the purpose is reforestation, it is known as aerial reforestation.

Aerial seeding is considered a broadcast method of seeding. It is often used to spread different grasses and legumes to large areas of land that are in need of vegetative cover after fires. Large wildfires can destroy large areas of plant life resulting in erosion hazards. Aerial seeding may quickly and effectively reduce erosion hazards and suppress growth of invasive plant species. Aerial seeding is an alternative to other seeding methods where terrain is extremely rocky or at high elevations or otherwise inaccessible. Problems with direct broadcast include germination, pests and seed predation by rodents or other wild animals. Transplanting seedlings from a plant nursery to the field is a more effective sowing technique. Aerial seeding has a low yield and require 25% to 50% more seeds than drilled seeding to achieve the same results.

Aerial seeding is also often used to plant cover crops. Some plants often seeded by this method are perennial rye (Timothy, Red Fescue, Red Top, Bluegrass), Sudan grass, soy beans, buckwheat, hairy vetch, corn, cereal rye, winter wheat, oats, mammoth or medium red clover, sweet clover, berseem clover and crimson clover (Timothy).

== History ==
According to the National Agricultural Aviation Association, the birthplace of aerial seeding in America was at Ohio in 1921. Lt. John A. Macready, a U.S. Army pilot, used a modified Curtis JN-6 to dust a field of catalpa trees with arsenate to kill sphinx moth larvae. This early crop dusting led to aerial seeding.

Aerial reforestation, a type of aerial seeding, specifically to repopulate forest land after some type of disaster was being used as early as the 1930s. Planes were used to seed mountain areas in Honolulu that were inaccessible to traditional methods after forest fires. These experiments were largely unsuccessful, because of poor seed dispersal: seeds failed to obtain enough kinetic energy to enter the soil and as a result were massively predated. This in turn generated an infestation of rodents in Hawaii.

By 1946 aerial seeding was being used in Oregon to seed more than 500 acres of Douglas fir, and Port Orford cedar as well as 100 acres of grassland and other trees that were burned by fire. In 1947 the Crown Zellerbach Corporation seeded over 1000 acres in Oregon.

Surplus planes from World War II were initially used for aerial seeding, with the open cockpit Stearman biplane used frequently. Because many veterans were trained to fly these planes, this led the way for many people to develop a business around aerial applications. Today professionals use planes powered by turboprop engines and are navigated by GPS for better accuracy.

=== Use of seed balls ===
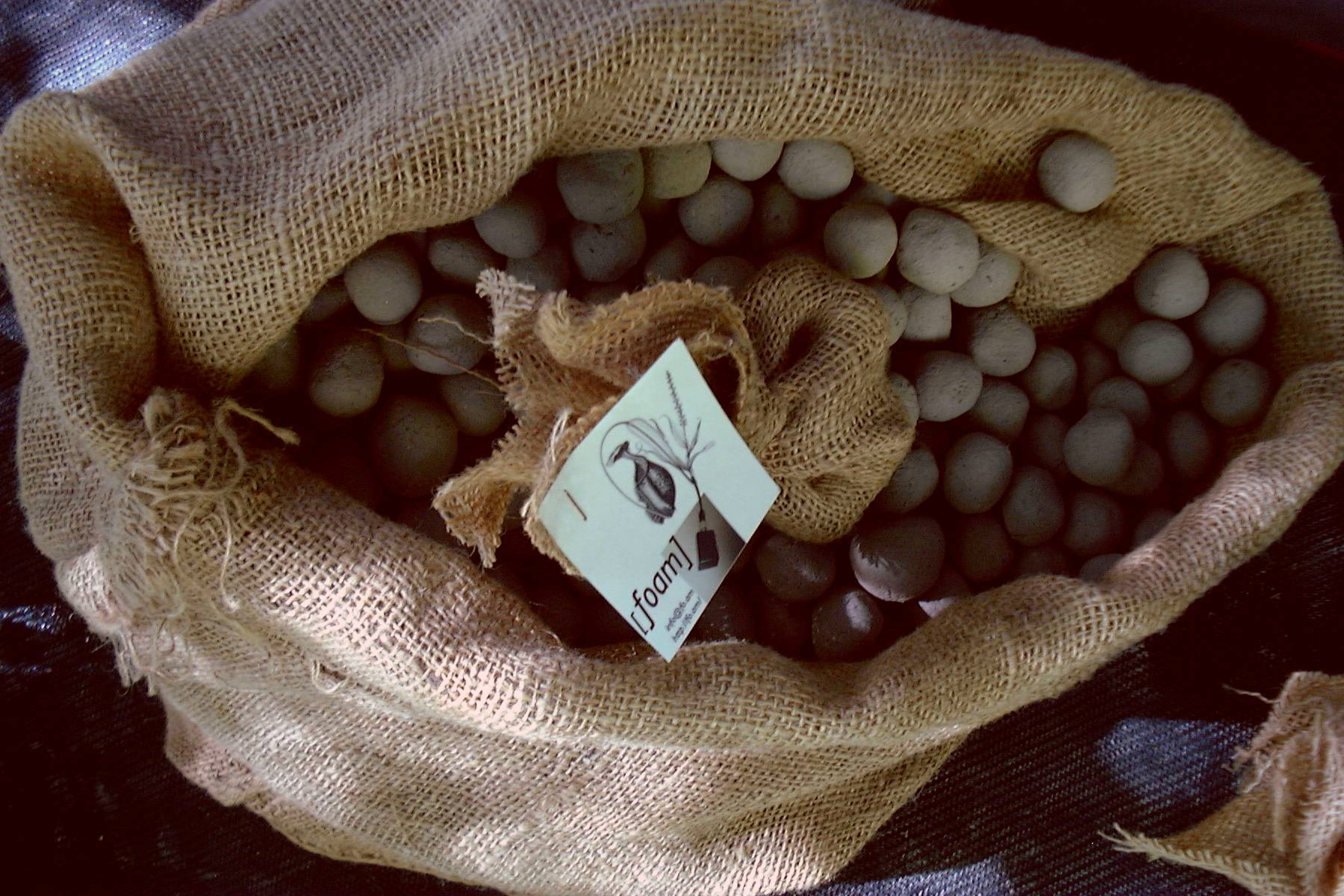
A sack of seed balls

In 1987, Lynn Garrison proposed the creation of a Haitian Aerial Reforestation Project (HARP), by which tons of seed would be scattered from specially modified aircraft. The seeds would be encapsulated in an absorbent material. This coating would contain fertilizer, insecticide/animal repellent and, perhaps a few vegetable seeds. Haiti has a bimodal rainy season, with precipitation in spring and fall. The seeds could have been moistened a few days before the drop, to start germination. The project never came to fruition.

Seed balls were experimentally used in aerial seeding in Kenya in 2016. This was an attempt to improve the yield of standard aerial seeding. The use of seed balls, instead of simple seeds, to perform aerial reforestation in Kenya seems to have produced desirable results. Seedballs Kenya (a collaboration between Chardust Ltd and Cookwell Jikos) has sold and overseen distribution over 16 million seedballs, as per November 2021. It is likely, though, that the majority of these seed balls are deployed traditionally instead than via aerial seeding and there is no published data to support the benefits of using seed balls via aerial seeding.

The most recent attempt at seed bombing was performed by DroneSeed, a company that opened in 2019. They claim to have devised a proprietary seed bomb that is able to deter animals from eating the seeds and, by using a mix of different seeds in the same bomb, to maximize the yield of the tree planting operations. Given the focus of this company on disaster relief, they have considered sapling darts not to be an effective solution since "nursery suppliers lack capacity to reforest after sizeable wildfires — especially repeat fires."

=== Saplings ===
A project in the late 1990s planned to drop saplings instead of seeds. Saplings would be encased in sturdy and biodegradable containers which would work as projectiles and pierce the ground at high velocity. This would likely guarantee a better yield when compared to simple aerial seeding or even seed bombing. This project was being developed in 1999 by a company called Aerial Reforestation Inc, in Newton, Massachusetts, based on an original idea by pilot Jack Walters. The company was planning to use military transport aircraft C-130, traditionally used to lay out landmines on combat fields. As per 2019, the company does not seem to be operating anymore. Other researchers are still investigating the potential of these "aerial sapling darts", by improving their aerodynamics to achieve better soil penetration and therefore higher reforestation yields. More research is needed to assess exactly their performance against other reforestation methods.

== Advantages ==
There are several advantages of aerial seeding:

- It achieves the most efficient coverage of a large area in the least amount of time.
- It facilitates seeding in areas that otherwise would be impossible to seed with traditional methods, such as land that is too hard to reach by non-aircraft or ground conditions being too wet.
- It may be used when existing crops are already planted. This is important when living in an area where there is a small window between harvesting the crop and the end of the growing season, because seeding cover crops after harvest can cause poor stand establishment due to cold temperatures or moisture.

== Soil conditions ==
Soil moisture plays a large role in the success of aerial seeding. Adequate soil moisture for germination and establishment of seed requires that the top 0.5 -1 inch be moist. These conditions should be at the time of the seeding or within 10 days of the seeding. If the required soil moisture is not present at these times, the seeds may become the target of predation by insects and other animals. Along with soil moisture, surface conditions also play a key role in the success of aerial seeding and establishment of seed.

The best soil surface conditions are those that are moist and friable. A loose and rough soil surface with cracks or residue cover is also very conducive to seed germination. These conditions allow for the seed to make the best contact with moist soil while adequately allowing the seed to settle into the ground. Another important factor besides soil surface conditions are that of timing of aerial seeding and seeding rates.

== Timing and seeding rates ==
When aerial seeding a cover crop, one must seed them at least 7 to 10 days before drilled cover crops. The reason for this is because the aerial seeding method is slower than that of the drilled method. Seeding rates for most plants should be 25% to 50% higher with aerial seeding, when compared to other more conventional methods like drilling. These higher seeding rates are needed to establish same yields as other methods. This is mostly because, with aerial seeding, the seed can be often on the soil surface longer, making the seed more susceptible to predation by birds, insects, and other animals.

== Helicopter vs. plane ==
There has been much debate with regards to which type of aircraft is better for aerial seeding. There is some evidence that shows helicopters may be best at the job when seeding in fields that are already established. This is because the wind from the blades of the helicopter causes the canopy of the already established crop to shake and open. This allows for more seed to reach the soil below. Another advantage for the helicopter is they are more maneuverable and can handle irregular shape fields while a plane has a harder time with such fields. The real advantage of the plane is it is faster than a helicopter and has the ability to carry a much heavier load. This allows the plane to finish the job much faster which equals less money spent in the air.

== Deployment methods ==
For cover crop use, the recommendation from USDA remains to be direct broadcast of seeds, without coating into balls.

=== Reforestation ===
Dropping seed balls from crop spraying aircraft is the most common method and the one practiced by Farmland Aviation, Kenya, one of the few companies active in this field. They claim to be able to spread up to six tons of tree seeds per hour over tens of thousands of acres.

Until 2017, drones were not used in aerial seeding. Low-cost UAVs lacked payload capacity and range limits them for most aerial seeding applications. A drone developed by Parrot SA and BioCarbon Engineering however has solved this issue. It is capable of dropping 100,000 pods a day.

Deployment by paraglider is being tested in Kenya and due to hopes of great reforestation rates because of low cost, low speed and altitudes, even if the seed spraying rate is likely to be much slower than deployment by larger aircraft.

== Feasibility and weaknesses ==
Despite its low yield, interest in aerial seeding has recently grown, while searching for a quick system to obtain reforestation and fight global warming. The advantage of using an airplane/helicopter is the ability to quickly seed large areas, even remote areas, otherwise impractical to be used in active reforestation.

Aerial seeding is therefore best suited to sites whose remoteness, ruggedness, inaccessibility, or sparse population make seedling planting difficult. It is particularly appropriate for "protection forests" because helicopters or planes can easily spread seed over steep slopes or remote watersheds and isolated dryland areas. It seems also well suited for use in areas where there may be a dearth of skilled laborers, supervisors, and funds for reforestation. It has the potential to help increase production of tree crops for forage, food, and honey as well as wood for fuel, posts, lumber, charcoal and pulp.

Seed balls and aerial reforestation are heavily sensitive to environmental conditions. Seeds deployment may not be practical in some cases because the site may require preparation or the season may be wrong. To germinate successfully, seeds usually must fall directly onto mineral soil rather than onto established vegetation or undecomposed organic matter. Where organic matter has accumulated thickly, the site must normally be burned, furrowed, or disked. The soil disturbance left after logging is often sufficient. Rough terrain is more amenable to broadcast seeding, but yields are typically low even in the best conditions.

On certain sites ground preparation may be necessary. Site preparation and the seeding operation must be well coordinated to meet the biological requirements for prompt seed germination and seeding survival. Dry sites may have to be specially ridged or disked so as to optimize the rainfall that reaches the seed. Excessively wet sites may need to be ridged or drained.

The degree of field slope is not critical as long as seeds find a receptive seedbed. Steep watersheds, eroding mountain slopes, bare hillsides, and spoil-banks where vegetation is sparse are often suitable for aerial seeding (however, on some steep slopes with smooth, bare soil, rain may wash the seeds away too easily for successful seeding).

Arid and savanna lands (for example, those where annual rainfall is under 800 mm) are most in need of reforestation. These are regions where aerial seeding in principle has potential. They include vast tracts of unused or poorly used land that has sparse tree cover and that is not confined to private land holdings, so it is generally accessible to aircraft. The native trees (such as species of Acacia, and other genera) in these areas are generally well adapted for survival under difficult field conditions. These are not species for timber as much as for firewood, forage, fruit, gum, erosion control, and other such uses.

As a prerequisite to any method of reforestation, the species selected must be adapted to the temperature, length of growing season, rainfall, humidity, photoperiod, and other environmental features of the area. Ideally, before aerial seeding takes place trial plots should be established to test those species most likely to germinate and grow successfully on the chosen sites. Even when one species has the right characteristics, it may be prudent to test seed of different provenances to find those best suited to the site.

Characteristics that make a particular species more or less appropriate for aerial seeding include:

- seed size
- seed availability
- ability of the seed to germinate on the soil surface
- germination and seedling growth speeds
- ability to withstand temperature extremes and prolonged dry periods (orthodox seed)
- ability to tolerate soil conditions
- light tolerance
- seed stability when stored in large quantities
- suitability of seed for handling with mechanical seeding devices,
- development speed of a deep taproot by seedlings to enable them to withstand adverse climatic conditions in the period following germination.

Species with highly palatable seeds have little prospect of success because wildlife eat the seed before it has a chance to germinate unless it is pelletized. Also, small seeds and lightweight, chaffy seeds are more likely to drift in the wind, so they are harder to target during the drop. Small seeds, however, fall into crevices and are then more likely to get covered with soil, thereby enhancing their chances of survival. Aerial seeding may prove to work best with "pioneer" species, which germinate rapidly on open sites, are adapted for growth on bare or disturbed areas, and grow well in direct sunlight.

== See also ==
- Agricultural drone
- Hydroseeding
