= Vertical tillage =

Vertical tillage (VT) is a system of principles and guidelines similar to conservation agriculture (CA) in that it aims to improve soil health, increase water infiltration and decrease soil erosion and compaction (improve bulk density). With varying degrees of soil movement, it aims to not invert the soil and keep residue on the surface where it protects the soil. It usually includes small forward-facing discs that limit soil inversion and slices the residue for faster decomposition and to get a seeder or planter into the heavy residue-laden fields. Many times it also includes a deep ripping tool for breaking up hard pans and compaction created from traditional tillage implements and heavy equipment like large tractors and combine harvesters.

Benefits include:

- less compaction - decreased and improved bulk density
- more efficient- faster field speeds (as compared to other tillage tools),
- cheaper (than conventional till),
- better management of heavy residue,
- warms the soil for earlier planting,
- leaves residue on the surface,
- reduce water runoff,
- reduces erosion,
- reducing chemical weed control measures,
- seeding into wet soils

Its proponents compare it and even include it into no-till and conservation agriculture categories. They claim that VT has helped particularly in the build-up of high levels of residues on the surface under zero-till and CA systems and the concomitant low soil temperatures and compaction problems have hindered crop establishment and growth in the temperate regions of North America. Its detractors may concede the above advantages but claim the vigorous soil movement excludes it from no-till and CA categories. This is important particularly in the United States, where it may exclude farmers in collection of direct farm payments from the US government that aims to promote no-till to conserve soil and keep it in place.

Besides this controversy, there is considerable variation in the definition of what constitutes VT, even among its proponents.
