= Liz Christy Garden =

Community garden in New York City

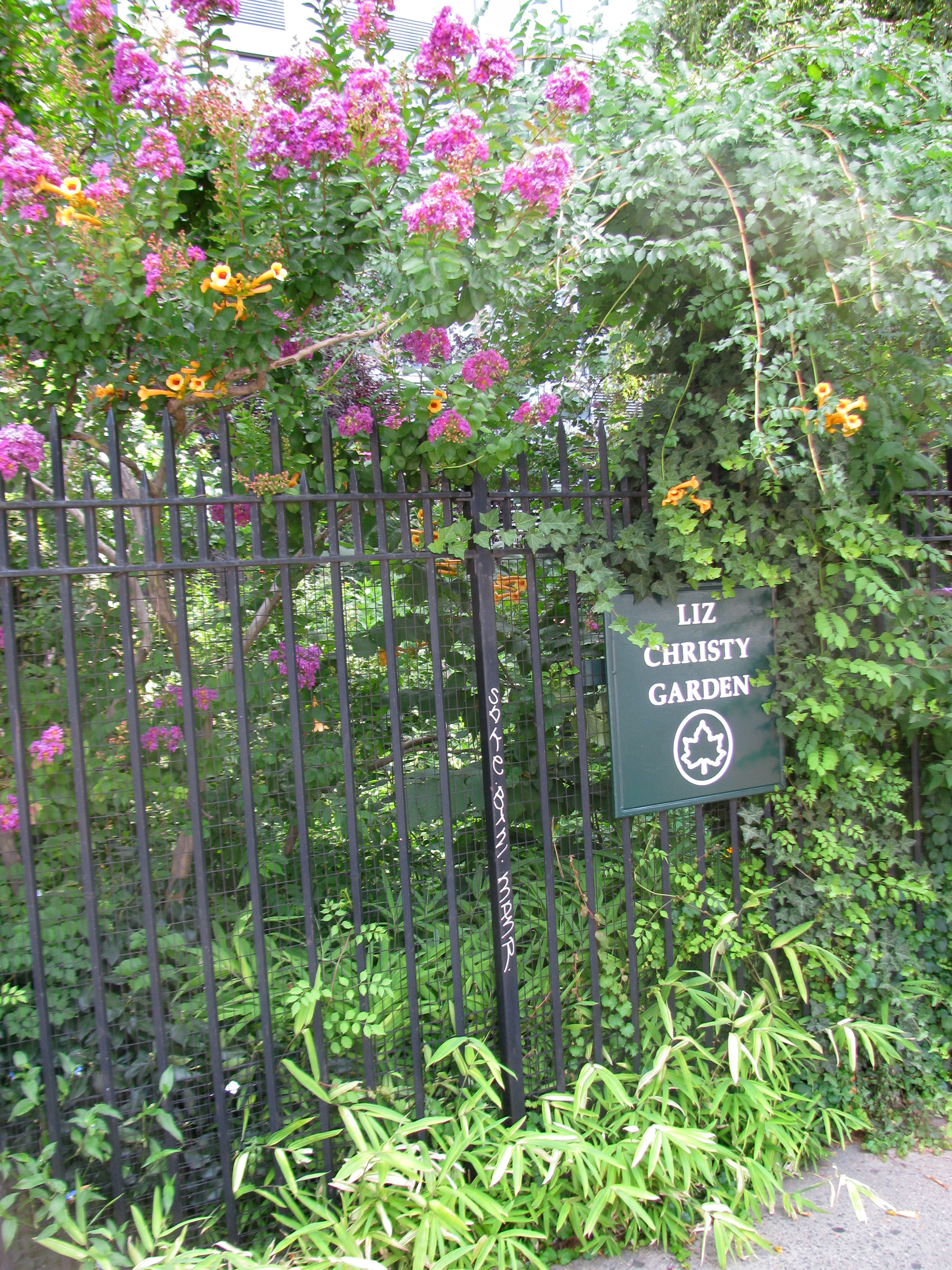
- Interactive map of Liz Christy Garden
- Type: Community garden
- Location: Manhattan, New York City
- Coordinates: 40.72403°N 73.99170°W
- Created: 1973; 53 years ago
- Founder: Liz Christy
- Website: www.lizchristygarden.us

The Liz Christy Bowery Houston Garden, officially started in 1974, is the first and oldest community garden in New York City. Located at the corner of the Bowery and Houston Street in Manhattan and running across to 2nd Avenue, it is now a part of New York City Parks Department.

== History ==
The Liz Christy Bowery Houston Garden, originally named "Bowery-Houston Community Farm and Garden," traces its origins to 1973 when neighbor Liz Christy successfully petitioned the City of New York for access to make the vacant lot a garden for $1 a month. In 1973, Christy founded urban community garden group, the Green Guerillas, and in 1974 led the group in cleanup and creation of the garden. The Liz Christy Bowery Houston Garden was the first winner of the American Forestry Association's Urban Forestry Award.

In 1985, the garden was renamed in Christy's honor upon her death due to cancer. In 2002, it became one of the protected community gardens by law. In 2013, it was included in the Bowery Historic District on the National Register of Historic Places.

== Garden ==
The garden feels like a private place despite the din of traffic with a varied terrain and mature trees and shrubs, and is maintained by approximately 20 volunteer gardeners. Magnolia and weeping birch trees are among the lush vegetation to be found there. Two ponds support fish and turtles, there is a perennial lotus, a native plant habitat, vegetables, herbs, and many flowering plants. The tallest Dawn Redwood tree in the city is located at the garden. The garden is open to the public on Saturday from noon until 4PM, all year, on Sundays from noon until 4 PM, May to October, and Tuesday & Thursday evenings from 6 p.m. until dusk from May until October.

== Media ==
The garden is included in many broadcast programs, magazines and papers. It is also featured in the BBC series Around the World In 80 Gardens with Monty Don.

== See also ==
- Community Gardens in New York City
- Community gardening in the United States
