= List of community gardens in New York City =

This is a list of community gardens in New York City, sorted by borough. There are over 500 public community gardens, including numerous urban farms, across the five boroughs of the city. Since the 1960s, community gardens have been developed and maintained on vacant lots throughout the city.

== Brooklyn ==
Name	Location	Managed By	Lifetime	About	Image
100 Quincy Community Garden	100 Quincy Street	NYC Parks / GreenThumb	2013-	Group of neighbors in Bedford-Stuyvesant turned a vacant lot at 100 Quincy into a community garden.	
1100 Bergen Street Community Garden	1107 Bergen Street	Brooklyn Queens Land Trust	1980-		
400 Montauk Community Garden	956 New Lots Ave	NYC Parks/ GreenThumb	Founded 1984, Rebuilt 2016-	4,000 square foot garden in East New York, went extinct for several years, rebuilt in a rubble-filled lot name=":7" />	
462 Halsey Community Farm	462 Halsey Street	NYC Parks / GreenThumb	2012-		
6/15 Green Community Garden	274 15th Street	Brooklyn Alliance of Neighborhood Gardens	1994-		
61 Franklin Street Garden	61 Franklin Street	NYC Parks	May 15, 2013-		
64th Street Community Garden	373 64th Street		1999-		
El Jardin de Hunts Point	927 Faile Street				
721 Decatur Street Community Garden	721 Decatur Street				
A Patch of Inspiration	633 Powell Street				
Aberdeen Street Community Garden	91 Aberdeen Street	New York Restoration Project	1989 -		
Abib Newborn	495 Osborn Street				
All People's Community Garden	149 Tompkins Avenue				
Amazing Garden	265 Columbia Street	GreenThumb	1994-	Garden occupies a lot that had been vacant since 1980 and had served as an unofficial garbage dump and an illegal parking area. Neighbors secured the lot through Local Community Board 6.	
Amboy Street Garden	208 Amboy Street				
American Heart Garden	122 Hart Street				
Artsy Bloom Community Garden	716 Sutter Avenue				
Ashford Learning Garden	341 Ashford Street				
Ashford Street Abundant Garden	330 Ashford Street				
BACDYS Garden (Bangladeshi American Development and Youth Services)	215 Forbell Street				
Backyard Garden	69 Hamilton Avenue				
Bed-Stuy Farm	404 Decatur Street				
Bedford Stuyvesant Community Garden (Lola Bryant Comm. Garden)	95 Malcolm X Boulevard				
Berry Street Garden	303 Berry Street				
Betty's Community Garden at Hull Street	227 Hull Street				
Big Red Community Garden	436 Van Siclen Avenue				
Bountiful Bliss Community Garden	1087 East 43rd Street				
Bridge Plaza Community Garden	153 Concord Street				
Bryant Hill Garden	901 Bryant Avenue				
Brooklyn Bears/Carlton Avenue Garden	397 Carlton Avenue				
Brooklyn Bears/Pacific Street Garden	590 Pacific Street				
Brooklyn Bears/Rockwell Place Garden	104 Rockwell Place				
Brooklyn's Finest Garden	48 Lefferts Place				
Brownsville Community Farm (James McKeather)	239 Herzl Street				
Brownsville Green Community Garden	1418 Eastern Parkway				
Bushwick Garden	50 Humbold Street	New York Housing Authority		Located at the Bushwick Houses	
CAUSA Festival Garden	790 Blake Avenue				
Canarsie Neighborhood Farm and Garden	9299 Schenck Street				
Cedar Tree Garden	305 Greene Avenue				
Central Bainbridge Street Community Garden	269 Patchen Avenue				
Chestnut Street Garden	9 Chestnut Street				
Citizens for a Better Community Garden	742 Monroe Street				
Clara's Garden	579 Glenmore Avenue				
Classon / Fulgate Block Association Garden	474 Classon Avenue				
Cleveland Street Vegetable Garden	433 Cleveland Street				
Clifton Place Memorial Garden & Park	1031 Bedford Avenue				
Concerned Citizens of Grove Street Community Garden	72 Grove Street				
Concerned Residents of Barbey Street	351 Barbey Street				
Contented Hart Garden	1475 Bushwick Avenue				
Cooper Street Block Buster Community Garden	41 Cooper Street				
Cooper Street Community Garden	34 Cooper Street				
Crystal Wells Community Garden	35 Crystal Street				
David Foulke Memorial Garden	248 Bergen Street				
Decatur Street Community Garden	1052 Decatur Street				
Dolly's Park	503 President Street				
Dumont Garden of Green	746 Dumont Avenue				
EL Garden	120 Jefferson Street				
ENY Oasis Community Garden	2539 Pitkin Avenue				
East New York Youth Farm	620 Schenck Avenue	United Community Centers (UCC)	2000-	Managed by 35 youth aged 13–15 from East New York who are selected for 9-month paid internships at the farm	
East 4th Street Community Garden (Windsor Terrace Kensington Veterans Memorial)	171 E 4th Street				
East End Community Garden	260 Van Siclen Avenue				
Eden Community Garden	2084 Pacific Street				
Eden’s Community Garden	1123 Saint Mark's Avenue				
El Puente: Espiritu Tierra Community Garden - Earth Spirit	207 South 2nd Street				
Elton Street Community Garden	585 Elton Street				
Escape to Nature	555 Glenmore Avenue				
Essex Street Community Garden	3030 Fulton Street				
Euclid / Pine Street Block Association Garden	1308 Dumont Avenue				
Euclid 500 Community Garden	532 Euclid Avenue				
F.A.R.R. Community Garden	808 Herkimer Street				
Family Community Garden Brooklyn	793 Cleveland Street				
Fantasy Garden	181 Legion Street				
Farmers Garden	1901 Bergen Street				
Feeding Tree Garden	340 Tompkins Avenue				
First Quincy Street Community Garden	397 Quincy Street				
Floral Vineyard	2379 Pitkin Avenue				
Fred McLeod Community Garden	1833 Strauss Street				
Fresh Farm	786 Livonia Ave. Brooklyn				
Friends of Flowers Community Garden	1905 Bergen Street				
Garden of Angels	978 Greene Avenue				
Garden of Eden	201 Myrtle Avenue	New York Housing Authority		Located at the Ingersoll Houses	
Garden of Hope	392 Hancock Street				
Garden of Plenty	19 Hunterfly Place				
Garden of Union (Annie's Garden)	634 Union Street				
Gates Harvest Garden	953 Gates Avenue				
George Washington Carver Community Garden	110 Walton Street				
Georgia Avenue Community Garden	328 New Lots Avenue				
Gil Hodges (Carroll Street Garden)	534 Carroll Street				
Go Vertical	479 Milford Street				
Good Life Garden	46 Goodwin Place				
Good Shepherds Community Group	555 Shepherd Avenue				
Grand Street Community Garden	239 Grand Street				
Granite Street Community Garden	30 Granite Street				
Green Dome	229 North 12th Street				
Green Gems	147 Fountain Avenue				
Green Space at President Street	222 5th Avenue				
Green Valley Garden	93 New Lots Avenue				
GreenSpace Native Plant Community Garden and Environmental Center	207 4th Avenue	NYC Parks / GreenThumb	2006–		
Greene Acres Community Garden	349 Greene Ave				
Greene Avenue United Neighbors Community Garden	490 Greene Avenue				
Greene Garden	2 South Portland Avenue				
Gregory's Garden	444 Warwick Street				
Halsey Ralph & Howard Community Garden	774 Halsey Street Brooklyn				
Hancock Community Backyard Garden Park	322 Hancock Street				
Hands & Heart (New Lots Urban Farm)	290 New Lots Avenue				
Hart to Hart Community Garden	108 Hart Street				
Hattie Carthan Community Garden	719 Marcy Avenue	NYC Parks / GreenThumb	1985–	Founded in 1985 and named in honor of neighborhood activist Hattie Carthan in 1998	
Hattie Carthan Herban Farm	49 Van Buren St				
Heaven's Gate Community Garden (Hart Street)	169 Hart Street				
Hendrix Street Block Association Garden	532 Hendrix Street				
Her-King Alagantic Community Garden	411 Herkimer Street				
Herbal Garden of East New York	281 Schenck Avenue				
Highland Park Community Garden	400 Jamaica Avenue				
Hollenback Community Garden	460 Washington Avenue				
Hooper Grove	375 South 5th Street				
Howard Garden	750 Howard Avenue				
Hoyt Street Community Garden	98 Hoyt Street	Hoyt Street Association	1975–		Image of an open gate with a small sign that says welcome on it. Arch above the gate says Hoyt Community Garden, and inside the garden is a mural of a large tree with roots going into the soil.
Hull Street Community Garden	145 Hull Street	New York Restoration Project			
Human Compass Community Garden	134 Sackett Street				
ISO Student Farm	514 Rockaway Avenue				
Imani Community Garden (Schenectady)	87 Schenectady Avenue				
Imani II Community Garden	1680 Pacific Street				
Infant Jesus Community Garden	36 Aberdeen Street				
Isabahlia Community Garden	615 Saratoga Avenue				
It's All About Brownsville	754 Thomas Boyland Street				
Jane Bailey Memorial Garden	327 Greene Avenue				
Java Street Community Garden	59 Java Street		2011–	The garden was established in 2011 on a vacant lot on Java Street and opened to the public a year later.	
Jerome Gardens	447 Jerome Street				
Jerome-Glenmore Cornerstone	314 Jerome Street				
Jerry and the Senior Gents of E.N.Y.	349 Schenck Avenue				
Jes Good Rewards Children's Garden	155 Amboy Street				
John the Baptist Community Garden	10 Stuyvesant Avenue				
Keap Fourth Community Garden	347 Keap Street				
Know Waste Lands	1278 Myrtle Avenue	NYC Parks / GreenThumb	2013-	Founded by BK ROT, a local youth-run composting service, to create a medium-scale compost site and wildlife garden	
Kosciusko Street Garden and Learning Center	385 Kosciusko Street				
La Casita Verde Community Garden	451 Bedford Avenue				
La Finca Community Garden	1034 Flushing Avenue				
Lefferts Place Community Garden	162 Lefferts Place				
Lentol Garden	478 Graham Avenue				
Lincoln Road Garden	316 Lincoln Road				
Lincoln-Berkeley Community Garden	20 Lincoln Place				
Linwood Street Garden	580 Linwood Street				
Living Laboratory Community Garden	289 Bristol Street				
Love Garden	862 Park Avenue	New York Housing Authority		Located at the Sumner Houses	
Madison Hill Community Garden	90 Madison Street				
Madison Square Association Garden	1262 Madison Street				
Madison Street Association	974 Madison Street				
Mama Dee's Community Garden	1397 Bedford Avenue				
Maple Street Community Garden	237 Maple Street	NYC Parks / GreenThumb	1999-	Founded on private property, the garden was bought by the City of New York in 2016 following a legal dispute	
Marge Matthews Garden	13 Louis Place				
McLeod Community Garden	130 Liberty Avenue				
Miraflores Community Garden	900 Broadway	New York Restoration Project			
MoCADA Ubuntu Garden	48 Lafayette Avenue				
Moffat Street Community Garden	9 Moffat Street				
Montauk Atkins Community Garden	214 Montauk Avenue				
Monty's Bradford Street Garden	522 Bradford Street				
Myrtle Village Green	636 Myrtle Avenue				
Nehemiah 10 Community Garden	565 Barbey Street				
New Jersey Avenue Community Garden	476 New Jersey Ave				
New Madison Harvest Community Garden	894 Madison Street				
New Vision Garden	590 Schenck Avenue				
Newkirk Community Garden	736 E 8th St, Brooklyn, NY				
Newport Garden	195 Newport Street				
Northside Community Garden	599 Driggs Avenue				
Nos Cuidamos Community Garden	104 Moore Street				
Olive Street Garden	25 Olive Street				
Oriental Garden	326 Jerome Street				
Paradise Community Garden	686 Glenmore Avenue				
Patchen Avenue Garden	49 Patchen Avenue				
Patchen Community Square Garden	142 Patchen Avenue	NYC Parks / GreenThumb	2012–	Located on the site of a former garden from the 1980s.	
Patrick Van Doren Pocket Park	123 Malcolm X Boulevard				
Phoenix Community Garden	16 Somers Street				
Pioneer Works Garden	Pioneer Street, Red Hook		2012–	In 2023 the garden became a certified National Wildlife Habitat, providing food and shelter for over 250 species of native and introduced plants, birds and insects that contribute to the biodiversity of Red Hook. The garden hosts performances.	
Pink's Paradise Garden of Love	1258 Loring Avenue	New York City Housing Authority	2015-	Part of East New York Farms and located at the Pink Houses	
Pirate's Cove Garden	313 Columbia Street				
Ponderosa Garden	660 East 105th Street				
Poplar Street Community Garden	25 Poplar Street				
Poppa & Momma Jones Historical Garden	337 Van Siclen Avenue				
Positive Seeds of Life Garden	554 Snediker Avenue				
Powell Street Garden	410 Livonia Avenue				
Powers Street Garden	278 Powers Street				
Prophecy Garden	67 Malta Street				
Prospect Farm	1194 Prospect Avenue				
Prospect Heights Community Farm	252-256 St. Marks Avenue				
Pulse Garden	228 York Street	New York City Housing Authority		Located at the Farragut Houses	
Q Gardens Community Farm	69 East 18th Street	Brooklyn Queens Land Trust		community farm and community compost project	
Ralph-Lincoln Service Center Garden	1654 St. John's Place				
Red Gate Garden	604 Marcy Avenue				
Red Shed Community Garden	264 Skillman Avenue				
Rogers/Tilden/Veronica Place Garden	2601 Tilden Avenue				
Santos Community Garden	2110 Mermaid Avenue				
Saratoga Farm	1969 Fulton Street				
Scholes Street Children’s Garden	134 Scholes Street				
Seasons of Vision Garden	9-11 Rochester Avenue				
Senior Garden	109 Lewis Avenue	New York Housing Authority		Located at the Roosevelt Houses	
Senior Retreat Garden	911 Myrtle Avenue	New York Housing Authority		Located at the Tompkins Houses	
Serenity Community Garden	4402 Ave. L				
Sheffield Garden	673 Sheffield Avenue				
Shield of Faith	81 Montauk Avenue				
Shiloh Garden	323 Monroe Street				
South Brooklyn Children's Garden	204 Columbia Street				
Spencer Street Community Garden	230A Spencer Street				
St. John's Place Renaissance Garden	1642 St. John's Place				
St. Mark's Avenue / Prospect Heights Community Garden	207 St. Marks Avenue				
Stars of Hope Community Garden	213 Madison Street				
Sterling Community Group Garden	1701 Sterling Place				
Stockholm Street Garden	143 Stockholm St	NYC Parks / GreenThumb	2023-		
Success Garden - East New York	461 Williams Avenue				
Summit Street Community Garden	281 Columbia Street				
Sumpter Street Community Garden	182 Sumpter Street				
Sunkissed Garden	658 Saratoga Avenue & 89 Blake Avenue				
Sunshine Community Garden	101 McKibbin Street				
Surfside Garden Multi-Cultural Coalition	2871 Surf Avenue				
T&T Vernon Block Community Garden	200 Vernon Avenue				
TLC Sculpture Park Garden	275 Glenmore Avenue				
Target Brooklyn (Bedford Avenue Block Association)	931 Bedford Avenue				
Tehuti Ma’at Community Garden	455 Ralph Avenue				
Ten Eyck Garden	17 Ten Eyck Street				
The People's Garden	1237 Greene Avenue	Brooklyn Queens Land Trust	1978-	Founded in 1978, the garden was abandoned in 1998 and later cleaned up again by neighbor Hernan Pagan.	
The Sunlight Garden	2985 Avenue X	New York Housing Authority		Located at the Sheepshead Nostrand Houses	
Tranquility Farm (Willoughby Ave. Garden)	267 Throop Avenue				
Triple R (Rest, Reflection, Relaxation)	641 Hendrix Street				
Umoja Garden	1448 Broadway				
Union Street Garden and Community Development	1029 Union Street				
United Herkimer Garden Club	97 Herkimer Street				
Upon This Rock Community Garden	2556 Pitkin Avenue				
Urban Meadow	125 Van Brunt Street				
Vernon Cases Community Garden	46Vernon Avenue				
Vernon and Throop Community Garden	253 Throop Avenue				
Victory Garden B5	613 Hendrix Street				
Vinegar Hill Community Garden	199 York Street				
Walt L. Shamel Community Garden	1095 Dean Street				
Warren-St.Marks Community Garden	623 Warren Street				
Warwick Street Greenery Glow Garden	601 Warwick Street				
Welcome Home Garden	681 Halsey Street				
West 23rd Street Community Garden	2403 Neptune Avenue				
Westbrook Memorial Garden	1233 Pacific Street				
Whole Neighborhood Garden	1001 Bedford Avenue				
Williams Avenue Community Garden	88 Williams Avenue				
Woodbine Street Block Association Garden	146 Woodbine Street				
Ying & Yang	11329 Seaview Avenue				

== The Bronx ==
Name	Location	Managed By	Lifetime	About	Image
138th Street Community Garden	624 East 138th Street	NYC Parks / GreenThumb		17,500 square feet garden	
159th Street Community Garden	379 East 159th Street	NYC Parks / GreenThumb		7,472 square feet garden	
211th Street Community Garden	739 East 211th Street	New York Restoration Project	1983-	3,016 square feet garden	
Bainbridge Garden	2980 Bainbridge Avenue	Bronx Land Trust		3,574 square feet garden	
Bathgate Community Garden	1818 Bathgate Avenue	New York Restoration Project		15,643 square feet garden	
Bean Morris Garden	2096 Morris Avenue	NYC Parks / GreenThumb		6,552 square feet garden	
Belmont Little Farmers	2485 Belmont Avenue	Bronx Land Trust		4,211 square feet garden	
Bette's Rose Garden	1017 Teller Avenue	New York Restoration Project		1,500 square feet garden	
Bissel Gardens	4525 Barnes Avenue	NYC Parks / GreenThumb		21,447 square feet garden	
Black Joy Farm	972 Simpson Street	NYC Parks / GreenThumb		4,300 square feet garden. Founded by Black Feminist Project	
Bronx River Community Garden	1086 East 180th Street	NYC Parks / GreenThumb		18,831 square feet garden	
Bronx Sunshine Garden	1768 Bryant Avenue	NYC Parks / GreenThumb		4,875 square feet garden	
Bruckner Mott Haven Garden	179 Bruckner Blvd	Bronx Land Trust		7,462 square feet garden	
Bryant Hill Community Garden	901 Bryant Avenue	NYC Parks / GreenThumb		15,440 square feet garden	
Carpenter Avenue Community Garden	4501 Carpenter Avenue	Department of Transportation		2,300 square feet garden	
Centro Cultural Rincon Criollo	749 Brook Avenue	NYC Parks / GreenThumb		7,782 square feet garden	
Claremont Neighborhood Garden	1280 Teller Avenue	NYC Parks / GreenThumb		8,411 square feet garden	
Clay Avenue Community Garden	1330 Clay Avenue	New York Restoration Project	1986-	4,518 square feet garden Founded by Claremont Homeowners Tenants Civic Improvement Association	
Clinton Avenue Community Garden	757 East 179th Street	New York Restoration Project		4,881 square feet garden	
College Avenue Garden	1420 College Avenue	NYC Parks / GreenThumb		18,929 square feet garden	
Concrete Dreams Community Garden	745 Jennings Street	NYC Parks / GreenThumb		3,077 square feet garden	
Cook Community Farm	2173 Bathgate Avenue	NYC Parks / GreenThumb		17,717 square feet garden	
Cordelia’s Garden	1311 Bristow Street	NYC Parks / GreenThumb		8,008 square feet garden	
Creston Jungle Playground	2242 Creston Avenue	New York Restoration Project	2001-	3,000 square feet garden Playground via KaBoom!	
Damiana Pizarro Community Garden	580 Crotona Park South	NYC Parks / GreenThumb		24,090 square feet garden	
Davidson Avenue Community Garden	2387 Davidson Avenue	Bronx Land Trust		4,882 square feet	
Demera Santiago Garden	941 Avenue St. John	NYC Parks / GreenThumb		2,687 square feet garden	
Dolorinda Lisante Community Garden	809 Courtlandt Avenue	NYC Parks / GreenThumb		2,782 square feet garden	
Eagle Slope	586 Westchester Avenue	NYC Parks / GreenThumb		17,136 square feet garden	
Eastchester Road Community Garden	3634 Eastchester Road	New York Restoration Project	1987-	4,400 square feet garden Founded by community living directly behind the property	
El Batey Borincano	815 Eagle Avenue	NYC Parks / GreenThumb	2002-	7,677 square feet	
El Batey de Dona Provi	504 East 178th Street	NYC Parks / GreenThumb			
El Coqui Liberation Community Garden	924 Melrose Avenue	NYC Parks / GreenThumb			
El Flamboyan	586 Tinton Avenue	NYC Parks / GreenThumb			
El Jardín de Los Amigos de Moore	515 Jackson Avenue	New York Housing Authority		Located at Moore Houses	
Eternal Life Community Garden	1810 University Avenue	NYC Parks / GreenThumb		3,600 square feet garden	
Farm in the Bronx	2179 Washington Avenue	NYC Parks / GreenThumb		8,689 square feet garden	
Flower garden	1460 Washington Avenue	New York Housing Authority		1,244 square feet garden Located at the Morris II Houses	
Fordham Bedford Lot-Busters	2599 Bainbridge Avenue	Bronx Land Trust		8,237 square feet garden	
Franklin Memorial Garden	1058 Cauldwell Ave	NYC Parks / GreenThumb		5,192 square feet garden	
Freeman Garden	1225 Hoe Avenue Bronx	NYC Parks / GreenThumb		1,772 square feet garden	
Friends of Brook Park Community Garden	494 East 141st Street	NYC Parks / GreenThumb		33,803 square feet garden	
Garden of Eden	1664 Weeks Avenue	NYC Parks / GreenThumb			
Garden of Happiness	2160 Prospect Avenue	NYC Parks / GreenThumb			
Garden of Life	1665 Weeks Avenue	NYC Parks / GreenThumb			
Garden of Youth	2175 Prospect Avenue	NYC Parks / GreenThumb			
Genesis Community Garden	1185 Franklin Avenue	NYC Parks / GreenThumb			
Glover Street Community Garden	1636 Castle Hill Avenue	NYC Parks / GreenThumb	1982-	1,209 square feet garden Founded as beautification project by local residents	
Green Patch on Walton	110 East 176th Street	NYC Parks / GreenThumb			
Grove Hill Community Garden	797 Eagle Avenue. (East 158th Street)	NYC Parks / GreenThumb			
Harding Park Community Garden	905 Harding Park	NYC Parks / GreenThumb			
Havemeyer Garden Association	512 Havemeyer Avenue	NYC Parks / GreenThumb			
Hispanos Unidos	2035 Honeywell Avenue	NYC Parks / GreenThumb			
Hornaday Community Garden	851 Hornaday Place	NYC Parks / GreenThumb			
Isla Verde Garden	625 Wales Avenue	NYC Parks / GreenThumb			
Jardin de la Familia	1507 Washington Avenue	NYC Parks / GreenThumb			
Jardin de las Rosas	15 Buchanan Place	NYC Parks / GreenThumb			
Jardin la Roca	438 East 160th Street	NYC Parks / GreenThumb			
Karol's Urban Farm	2225 Lacombe Avenue	New York Housing Authority		Located at the Castle Hill Houses	
Kelly Street Garden	924 Kelly Street		2014–	2,500 square feet garden in the South Bronx's Longwood neighborhood. Located in the joint backyard of five apartment buildings.	
Krystal Community Garden	2093 Vyse Avenue	NYC Parks / GreenThumb			
La Finca Del Sur	175 East 138th Street	NYC Parks / GreenThumb			
La Isla USA	836 Elton Avenue	NYC Parks / GreenThumb			
La Isla Youth Community Garden	96 West 163rd Street	NYC Parks / GreenThumb			
Las Casitas Community Garden	1130 Woodycrest Avenue	NYC Parks / GreenThumb			
Leave It Better Community Garden	1974 Grand Avenue	NYC Parks / GreenThumb			
Little Paradise Community Garden	1062 Grant Avenue	NYC Parks / GreenThumb			
Magnolia Tree Community Garden	668 St. Ann's Avenue	NYC Parks / GreenThumb		1,205 square feet garden	
Manor Avenue Seniors Garden	1021 Manor Avenue	Bronx Land Trust		2,500 square feet garden	
Mapes Avenue Garden	2124 Mapes Avenue	Bronx Land Trust		6,765 square feet garden	
Marie Brooks Community Garden	722 Home Street	NYC Parks / GreenThumb		9,148 square feet garden	
Melrose Houses Community Garden	345 East 153rd Street	New York Housing Authority		1,200 square feet garden Located at the Melrose Houses	
Melrose New Generation Community Garden	377 East 160th Street	NYC Parks / GreenThumb		5,064 square feet garden	
Mildred T. Rhodebeck Garden (Garden of Eden)	927 Faile Street	New York Restoration Project		9,984 square feet garden	
Miracle Garden - Bronx	851 Fairmont Place	NYC Parks / GreenThumb		5,325 square feet garden	
Model T Community Garden	1312 Bristow Street	NYC Parks / GreenThumb		10,760 square feet garden	
Morning Glory Community Garden	1221 Hoe Avenue	NYC Parks / GreenThumb	2009-2011 and 2014-	10,286 square feet garden Relocated in 2014 as a part of the Gardens for Healthy Communities Program within the New York City Mayor's Obesity Task Force Initiative	
Mosaic Success Garden	1315 Odgen Avenue	NYC Parks / GreenThumb		14,647 square feet garden	
NYRP Members Garden (Dalia Group)	724 Courtlandt Avenue	New York Restoration Project	1994-	2,500 square feet garden	
Neighborhood Advisory Committee Community Garden	360 E. 151st Street	NYC Parks / GreenThumb			
New Beginnings Community Garden	2502 Davidson Avenue	NYC Parks / GreenThumb			
New Hoe Avenue Garden	958 Hoe Avenue	NYC Parks / GreenThumb			
New Roots Community Farm	670 Grand Concourse	Sheryl Durrant		Half acre community farm hosting a farmers market and various workshops.	
Oasis on the Green	1981 Lafontaine Ave.	NYC Parks / GreenThumb			
North Bronx Collective	Bailey Avenue Tibbetts Tail	NYC Parks			
Padre Plaza	545 East 139th Street	NYC Parks / GreenThumb			
Palmas del Caribe (Eagle Avenue Community Garden)	869 Eagle Avenue	NYC Parks / GreenThumb			
Paradise on Earth Community Garden	1105 Fox Street	NYC Parks / GreenThumb	1981-	10,897 square feet garden Founded as part of Police Athletic League program	
Pelham Organic	985 Waring Avenue	New York Housing Authority		Located at the Pelham Houses	
People Garden	414 Morris Ave	New York Housing Authority		Located at the Patterson Houses	
Perry's Garden (Concerned Tenants of Daly Avenue)	2139 Daly Avenue	NYC Parks / GreenThumb			
Rainbow Garden of Life and Health	757 Melrose Avenue	NYC Parks / GreenThumb			
Randall Community Garden	1834 Randall Avenue	NYC Parks / GreenThumb			
Rays of Sunshine Community Garden (Family Group Garden)	418 East 158th Street	NYC Parks / GreenThumb			
Risse Street Community Garden	10 Risse Street Garden	NYC Parks / GreenThumb			
Rivers Run Community Garden	801 Co-op City Blvd	NYC Parks / GreenThumb			
Roberto Clemente Community Garden	1276 Shakespeare Avenue	NYC Parks / GreenThumb			
Schomburg Arts Garden	1009 Rev James A Polite Ave	NYC Parks / GreenThumb			
Sun, Wind & Shade Oasis	955 Sherman Avenue	NYC Parks / GreenThumb			
Sweetgum Community Garden	995 Summit Avenue	NYC Parks / GreenThumb			
Synergi Urban Garden	1211 Hoe Avenue	NYC Parks / GreenThumb			
Taqwa Community Farm	90 W 164th Street	NYC Parks / GreenThumb	1992-	Founded by Abu Talib and named Taqwa, Arabic for "the peace"	
Target Bronx (Anderson Avenue Community Garden)	1001 Anderson Avenue	NYC Parks / GreenThumb	1982–	15,500 square feet garden	
The Classics Bronx Community Garden	551 Cauldwell Avenue	NYC Parks / GreenThumb			
The Gus Dinolis Waterfront Garden - The Hidden Gem	2008 Gildersleeve Avenue				
The William Rainey Garden	685 Beck Street	NYC Parks / GreenThumb			
Townsend Garden	1735 Walton Avenue	NYC Parks / GreenThumb			
Ujamaa Northeast Community Garden	3601 Marolla Place	NYC Parks / GreenThumb			
Union Garden	950 Union Ave	New York Housing Authority		Located at the Union Houses	
United We Stand Garden (Sunflower / Girasol)	627 East 137th Street	NYC Parks / GreenThumb			
Vogue Community Garden	431 E. 156th Street	NYC Parks / GreenThumb			
Wanaqua Garden	462 East 136th Street	NYC Parks / GreenThumb			
Waterfront Community Garden	40°48′36″N 73°51′02″E				
William Hooper Garden (Jacquline Denise Davis Garden)	586 E 165th Street	NYC Parks / GreenThumb			
Willis Avenue Community Garden (Bronx Community & Cultural Garden)	378 Willis Avenue	NYC Parks / GreenThumb	1997-	9,063 square feet garden Founded by Congregational Church of North New York members	
Wishing Well Garden	864 Reverend James A. Polite Avenue	NYC Parks / GreenThumb			
Woodycrest Community Garden	949 Woodycrest Avenue	NYC Parks / GreenThumb			

== Manhattan ==
Name	Location	Managed By	Lifetime	About	Image
103rd Street Community Garden	105 East 103rd Street	Disney, KaBOOM!, East Harlem Community Members	2004–	Multi-disciplinary garden, community space	
11 BC Serenity Garden	626 East 11th Street				
117th Street Community Garden	172 East 117th Street				
11th Street Community Garden	422 East 11th Street	Manhattan Land Trust			
133rd Swing Street Garden	155 West 133rd Street				
5th Street Slope Children's Garden	626-27 E. 5th Street	NYC Parks / GreenThumb	1993-		
6 BC Botanical Garden	624 East 6th Street		1981–		at the 2024 event Howling for Jeremy Steig music performance
6&B Garden	6th St and Ave B, East Village	6th Street and Avenue B Garden	1984	Member-run, originally via a 1-year lease from Green Thumb, and later via a license by the City of New York.	
6th Street & Avenue B Garden	84 Avenue B				
Albert's Garden	16-18 East 2nd Street	Manhattan Land Trust	1971–	Named after Albert Eisenlau, an antiques dealer and a local resident. Albert Eisenlau was one of the founding members along with Louise Kruger and Ben Wohlburg. This garden was built after 16 and 18 East 2nd Street plots were repossessed by the City of New York for unpaid taxes.	
All People's Garden, Inc.	293-295 East 3rd Street	NYC Parks / GreenThumb	1978–	Founded by a former VISTA volunteer to combat drug use in the neighborhood and support healthy lives of children	
Arboretum Community Garden	550 West 125 Street	New York Housing Authority		Located at the Grant Houses	
Bradhurst Community Garden of Love	321 W 152nd Street				
Brisas Del Caribe	237 E 3rd Street	NYC Parks / GreenThumb	1986–	Founded by a neighborhood couple with support from the Green Guerrillas and other neighborhood groups	
Campos Community Garden	644 East 12th Street		1982–	Founded in 1982 and revived in 2004 after falling into disrepair	
Carmen Pabon Del Amanecer Jardin	117 Avenue C		1970s–	named after Carmen Pabon, a Lower East Side poet and gardener who died in 2016 at the age of 95.	
Carrie McCracken TRUCE Garden	145 St. Nicholas Avenue				
Carver Community Garden	236-242 East 124th Street				
Chico Mendez Mural Garden	11th Street between Avenues A and B		Early 1990s-1997	Named after Chico Mendes and demolished during the Guiliani administration	
Children's Magical Garden	131 Stanton Street		1985–	Founded by community activists who sought to improve their neighborhood, a vibrant community garden where generations of children have thrived	
Clayton Williams Garden	303 W 126th Street				
Clinton Community Garden	436 West 48th Street				
Clinton Community Garden (LES)	171 Stanton Street				
Clyde Romero Memorial Garden	213 East 7th Street				
Corozal Family	170 East 117th Street				
Creative Little Garden	530 East 6th Street	NYC Parks / GreenThumb	1978–	Founded by Francoise Cachelin and renovated by GrowNYC in 2004	
De Colores Community Yard & Cultural Center	313 E 8th Street		1996–	Community flower garden and gathering place founded by the gardeners of ABC garden after its demolition by the City of New York	
Diamante Garden / Dimantis Garden	308 East 118th Street				
Dias Y Flores	520 East 13th Street	NYC Parks / GreenThumb	1978–	Founded by the 13th Street Block Association	
Diversity Edible Farm Garden	1673 Madison Avenue				
Dorothy K. McGowan Memorial Garden	513 W 158th Street	New York Restoration Project	1980–	Renamed from "Iglesia Pentacostal Arca de Salvacion" after the garden received a grant from the Dorothy Strelsin Foundation to add a performance area and storage space.	
Dorothy Strelsin Memorial Garden	174 Suffolk Street	Suffolk Street Committee of Poor People			
Down to Earth Garden	546 East 12th Street	NYC Parks / GreenThumb	1993/94–	Renamed in 2020 from Children’s Garden	
Earth People	333 East 8th Street				
East Harlem Community Garden	429-433 East 117th Street				
East Side Outside Community Garden	415 East 11th Street	NYC Parks / GreenThumb	1993-	Part of the Open Road Park	
Edgecombe Avenue Garden Park Sanctuary	339 Edgecombe Avenue				
Edward P. Bowman Park	52 W 129th Street				
El Barrio Community Garden	415 East 117th Street				
El Barrio Garden of Angels	102 East 122nd Street				
El Cataño Garden	171 East 110th Street				
El Jardin del Paraiso	710 East 5th Street	Operated by community members and the NYC Department of Parks & Recreation	1981–	Environmental Awareness and Educational Community Park	from the fire jumping festival in 2018
El Sol Brillante Jr.	537 East 12th Street	Trust for Public Land	1977–	Founded by residents of the block interested in neighborhood revitalization and community organizing.	
Electric Ladybug Garden	237 West 111th Street				
Elizabeth Langley Memorial Garden	123 West 137th Street				
Elizabeth Street Garden		New York City Housing Authority	1991–	Founded in 1991, New York City Housing Authority took over the land in 2012 with plans to erect a residential building. The development was later cancelled in 2005.	
Esperanza Garden			1978-2000	Demolished by the city government, after an ongoing feud between community residents and the Giuliani administration	
Family Community Garden Manhattan	156 East 111th Street				
Family Garden by Tiffany & Co.	431 East 114th Street				
Fifth Street Slope Garden	626-27 East 5th Street				
Fireman's Memorial Garden	358-362 East 8th Street		1979–	An arson occurred in the abandoned building formerly on this site in 1977 where fireman Marty Celic died during the firefight. The memorial garden was created in that memory and adjoins a neighboring garden.	
First Street Garden	48 East 1st Street				
Fishbridge Park Garden	340 Pearl Street				
Five Star Gardens	252 West 121st Street				
Flower Door Garden	135 Avenue C				
Francisco “Pancho” Ramos Community Garden	703 East 9th Street				
Frank White Memorial Garden	506 West 143rd Street				
Frederick Douglass Boulevard Community Garden	300 W 152nd Street				
Garden of Eden			1975–1986	Created by Adam Purple, the garden was later razed for low-income housing	Garden of Eden, 1984
Garden of Love	304 West 116th Street				
Garden of the Humanitarians	272 East 4th Street				
Gatehouse Garden	1195 Amsterdam Ave				
Green Oasis Community Garden / Gilbert's Garden	372 East 8th Street		1981–	Gilbert’s Sculpture Garden merged in the 1990s with its neighbor, Green Oasis, to create one of the most child-friendly gardens in NYC.	
Harlem Grown 127th Street Learning Annex	128 West 127th Street	Harlem Grown			
Harlem Grown 131st Street Farm	34 West 131st Street	Harlem Grown			
Harlem Grown 134th Street Farm	116 West 134th Street	Harlem Grown			
Harlem Grown 134th Street Green House	126 West 134th Street	Harlem Grown			
Harlem Grown P.S. 125 Community Garden	425 West 123rd Street	Harlem Grown			
Harlem Roots Community Garden	203 W. 120th Street				
Harlem Rose Garden	8 East 129th Street				
Harlem Valley Garden	197 West 134th Street				
Harlem Village Green	54 W 129th Street				
Herb Garden (formerly 111th St. Betterment Assoc.)	176 E 111th Street				
Home Depot Children's Garden	421 East 117th Street				
Hope Garden	193 East 2nd Street				
Hope Steven Garden	1656 Amsterdam Avenue				
Humacao Community Garden	335 E 108th Street				
Jackie Robinson Community Garden	103 East 122nd Street				
Jane Street Garden	36 Jane Street				
Jenny's Garden	699 W 138th Street				
Joseph Daniel Wilson Memorial Gardens	219 W. 122nd Street				
Kenkeleba House Garden	212 East 3rd Street				
La Casita	223 E. 119th Street				
La Casita Garden	339 East 8th Street	New York Restoration Project	1990-	Primarily used by the community as an event and gathering space	
La Cuevita Community Garden	71 East 115th Street				
La Perla Community Garden	76 W. 105th Street				
La Plaza Cultural-Armando Perez	674 East 9th Street	NYC Parks / GreenThumb	1976-	Community garden, park, playground, wildlife refuge, urban farm, community composting site, and performance venue	
LaGuardia Corner Community Garden	511 LaGuardia Place				
Le Petit Versailles Garden	247 East 2nd Street	NYC Parks / GreenThumb	1996-	Founded as a queer public space by the co-directors of ABC No Rio	
Life Spire	2015 Lexington Avenue				
Liz Christy Garden	110 E Houston Street	NYC Parks / GreenThumb	1974-	First and oldest community garden in New York City	
Los Amigos	221 East 3rd Street	NYC Parks / GreenThumb	1980s–		
Los Amigos Garden	326 Pleasant Avenue	New York Restoration Project			
Love Garden	230 West 129 street	New York Housing Authority		Located at the Saint Nicholas Houses	
Lower East Side People Care	25 Rutgers Street				
Lucille McClarey Wicked Friendship Garden	499 West 150th Street				
Luigi's Garden of Love	227 West 115th Street				
Lydia's Magic Garden (El Girasol Magic Garden)	1665 Park Avenue				
M'Finda Kalunga Garden	179 Chrystie Street	Roosevelt Park Community Coalition	1983-	Means “Garden at the Edge of the Other Side of the World” in the Kikongo language. It is named in memory of the “second” African American burial ground that was located on nearby Chrystie Street between Rivington and Stanton Streets.	
Maggie's Garden	564 West 149th Street				
Maggie's Magic Garden	1574 Lexington Avenue				
Marble Hill Garden	5240 Broadway	New York Housing Authority		2,048 square feet garden Located at the Marble Hill Houses	
Miracle Garden	194 East 3rd Street	NYC Parks / GreenThumb	1983-		
Mission Garden	65 East 111th Street				
Mo' Pals	545 West 147th Street				
Mobilization For Change Community Garden	955 Columbus Avenue				
Morris Jumel Community Garden	457 West 162nd Street				
Neighbors of Vega Baja	320 E. 109th Street				
Oasis Community Garden	505 West 52nd Street				
Olga's El Gallo Community Garden	1891-1895 Lexington Avenue				
Orchard Alley	350 East 4th Street				
Our Little Green Acre (Garden Eight)	277 West 122nd Street				
Our Neighborhood Place	77 West 127th Street				
Pa'lante Community Garden	1651 Madison Avenue				
Papo's Garden	220 E. 119th Street				
Parque De Tranquilidad	314-318 East 4th Street	NYC Parks / GreenThumb	1979-	Located on the site of a former synagogue	
Peaceful Valley	52 East 117th Street				
Peach Tree Garden	236 East 2nd Street	NYC Parks / GreenThumb	1982-	Named for the original peach tree planted by founders	
Pleasant Village Community Garden	342-353 Pleasant Avenue				
PS 84 Lillian Weber Rooftop Garden Classroom	32 West 92 Street	PS 84	2019-		
RING - Riverside Inwood Neighborhood Garden	236 Dyckman Street				
Rev. Linnette C. Williamson Memorial Park	65 West 128th Street				
Robert L. Clinkscales Playground and Community Garden (C.G. of West 146th St.)	234 West 146th Street				
Rodale Pleasant Park Community Garden	437 East 114th St/448 East 115th St				
Roosevelt Island Community Garden		Roosevelt Island Operating Corporation (RIOC)		c 1989-	
Sage's Garden	281 East 4th Street				
Sam & Sadie Koenig Garden	237 E. 7th Street				
Secret Garden	293 East 4th Street				
Serenity Garden	15 East 99th Street	New York Housing Authority		Located at the Lexington Houses	
Serenity Gardens	522 West 146th Street				
Siempre Verde Garden	181 Stanton Street - 137 Attorney Street	NYC Parks / GreenThumb			
Smith Garden	10 Catherine Slip, New York, NY	New York Housing Authority		Located at the Alfred Smith Houses	
St. Nicholas Miracle Garden	330 Saint Nicholas Avenue				
Sugar Hill Garden	333 Edgecombe Avenue				
Sugar Hill Hope Garden	475 W 152nd Street				
The Julia Gabriel People's Garden	1039 Amsterdam Avenue				
Toyota Childrens Learning Garden (Coradan Evaeden)	603 East 11th Street				
Unity Park	55 West 128th Street				
Vamos A Sembrar	198 Avenue B	NYC Parks / GreenThumb		The garden used to be two separate gardens until 2019, when they were combined	
Villa Santurce	95 East 111th Street				
Walter Miller III Memorial Garden (La Casa Frela)	13 West 119th Street				
West 104th Street Garden	8 West 104th Street				
West 123rd Street Community Garden	116 W. 123rd Street				
West 124th Street Community Garden	77 West 124th Street				
West 132nd Street Garden	108 West 132nd Street				
West 181st Street Beautification Project	814 West 181st Street				
West 87th Street Park & Garden	55 West 87th Street				
West Side Community Garden	Columbus Avenue between West 89th and 90th	Privately owned 501(c)(3) garden	1975-		
William A. Harris Garden	869 St Nicholas Ave		1979-		
William B. Washington Memorial Garden	325 West 126th Street				

== Queens ==
Name	Location	Managed By	Lifetime	About	Image
45th Street Composters and Community Garden, aka Resistance is Fertile	41-12 45th Street	Western Queens Guerrilla Gardeners	2020-Present		45th Street Composters and Community Garden in Spring
97th Street Community Garden	33-28 97th Street				
Back To Eden Community Garden	144-29 Lakewood Avenue				
Bay 84th Street Community Garden	322 Beach 84th Street				
Beach 91 Community Garden	136 Beach 91st Street				
Cambria Heights Community Garden	227th St. Cambria Heights				
Community Serenity Garden	30-15 Seagirt Boulevard				
Corona Peachtree Community Garden	52-02 102nd Street				
Curtis "50 Cent" Community Garden	117-09 165th Street				
Discovery Community Garden 1	108-56 Union Hall Street				
Discovery Community Garden 2	108-59 Union Hall Street				
Dunton Community Garden	143-01 Shore Avenue				
Edgemere Farm	385 Beach 45th Street				
Evergreen Community Garden	47-32 Colden Street		1983–	In 1983, a group of Korean immigrants leased a 5.1-acre space in Kissena Park and established the garden. It was intended for recreational purposes and growth of vegetables and flowers, though for-profit farming was prohibited. Ownership of the garden was transferred from the Korean American Senior Center to the Parks Department in 2012, though this sparked a years-long dispute.	
FF Michael Brennan Memorial LIC Roots Community Garden	29-08 47th Avenue				
Far Rock Urban Agro-Education Center	378 Beach 45th Street				
Garden of Resilience	179-18 145th Drive				
George Eagle Carr Community Garden	89-23 148th Street				
George Washington Carver Botanical Garden	109-19 156th Street				
Liberty Collective Learning Gardeners	106-17 173rd Street				
Long Island City Community Garden	5-30 49th Avenue				Interior view of Long Island City Community Garden
Malcolm X Garden	33-12 112th Street				
McIntosh Neighborhood Association Garden	25-16 McIntosh Street				
Merrick-Marsden Neighborhood Association Garden	118-18 Merrick Boulevard				
Merrick-Marsden Neighborhood Association Garden II	117-02 Merrick Boulevard				
Paradise Community Garden NY	107-29 Inwood Street		2020–	The garden was established during the COVID-19 pandemic amid concerns by its founder, Sonia Ferraro, of scarcity of quality food.	
Pembroke/Van Nostrand Court Garden	253-15 Pembroke Avenue				
Phoenix Gate Community Garden	171-03 120th Avenue				
Project Eden	67-02 Kessel Street				
Queens Botanical Garden Urban Farm	43-50 Main St, Flushing, NY 11355		2013–Present	The Queens Botanical Urban Farm has gone through various changes since it began in 2013. It started as an allotment garden for senior citizens in the community to then an intergenerational garden, inviting high school students to grow alongside long-time members. Now it is a space that is managed by staff and produce grown on the farm is donated to food pantries in Queens and works with various high schools to teach sustainable urban agriculture.	Sunflowers and agricultural crops on an urban farm in Queens, NY
Queens New Roots (East)	41-38 69th St				
Queens New Roots (West)	41-38 69th St				
Rockaway Roots Urban Farm	308 Beach 58th Street				
Rockaway Youth Community Power	310 Beach 58th Street				
Seagirt Boulevard Community Garden	30-03 Seagirt Boulevard				
Serinor Community Garden	90-20 170th Street, Queens 11432	New York Housing Authority		Located at the International Towers	
Smiling Hogshead Ranch	25-30 Skillman Avenue	NYC Parks / GreenThumb	2011–	The Smiling Hogshead Ranch was originally a guerrilla garden on a freight spur of the abandoned Montauk Cutoff. In 2013, its founders obtained permission from the MTA to operate on the abandoned right-of-way.	
South Jamaica Infinity Garden	150-12 115th Drive				
Sparrow's Nest Community Garden	54-01 101st Street				
Sunset Community Garden	18-34 Willoughby Avenue				
The Community Pride	49-11 Broadway Queens	New York Housing Authority		Located at the Woodside Houses	
The Garden By The Bay	480 Beach 43rd Street				
Trees of Life Organic Garden	106-17 173rd Street				
Two Coves Community Garden	11-01 30th Avenue				Raised beds with short green plants and black wire frames over them.
Windmill Community Garden	39-22 29th Street40.647229°N 73.950099°W				

== Staten Island ==
Name	Location	Managed By	Lifetime	About	Image
Hill Street Community Garden	50 Hill Street				
Joe Holzka Community Garden	1170 Castleton Avenue				
Olivet Heavenly Harvest	97 Myrtle Avenue				
Roots of Peace Community Garden	390 Targee Street				
Skyline Community Garden	40-66 Prospect Avenue				
South Beach community garden	100 Kramer street 10306	New York Housing Authority			
West Brighton Community Garden	899 Henderson Avenue				
Westervelt Community Garden	143 Westervelt Avenue				
Moravian Community Garden	1657 Victory Blvd.			church garden	
