= The People's Garden =

Community garden in New York City

Coordinates: 40°41′30.5″N 73°55′32″W

The People's Garden is a community garden established by Hernan Pagan in the Bushwick neighborhood of Brooklyn, New York City, United States. It is located on Broadway between Van Buren Street and Bushwick Avenue.

== History ==
This garden started as the Green Avenue Block Association Garden, but was later renamed the People's Garden. Known for its salsa dance parties and many other community events, the space is a gathering place created for and by the community.

== See also ==
- Community Gardens in New York City
- Community gardening in the United States
- List of New York City Block and Neighborhood Associations
