= Maple Street Community Garden =

Community garden in Brooklyn, New York City

Coordinates: 40°39′39″N 73°57′10″W

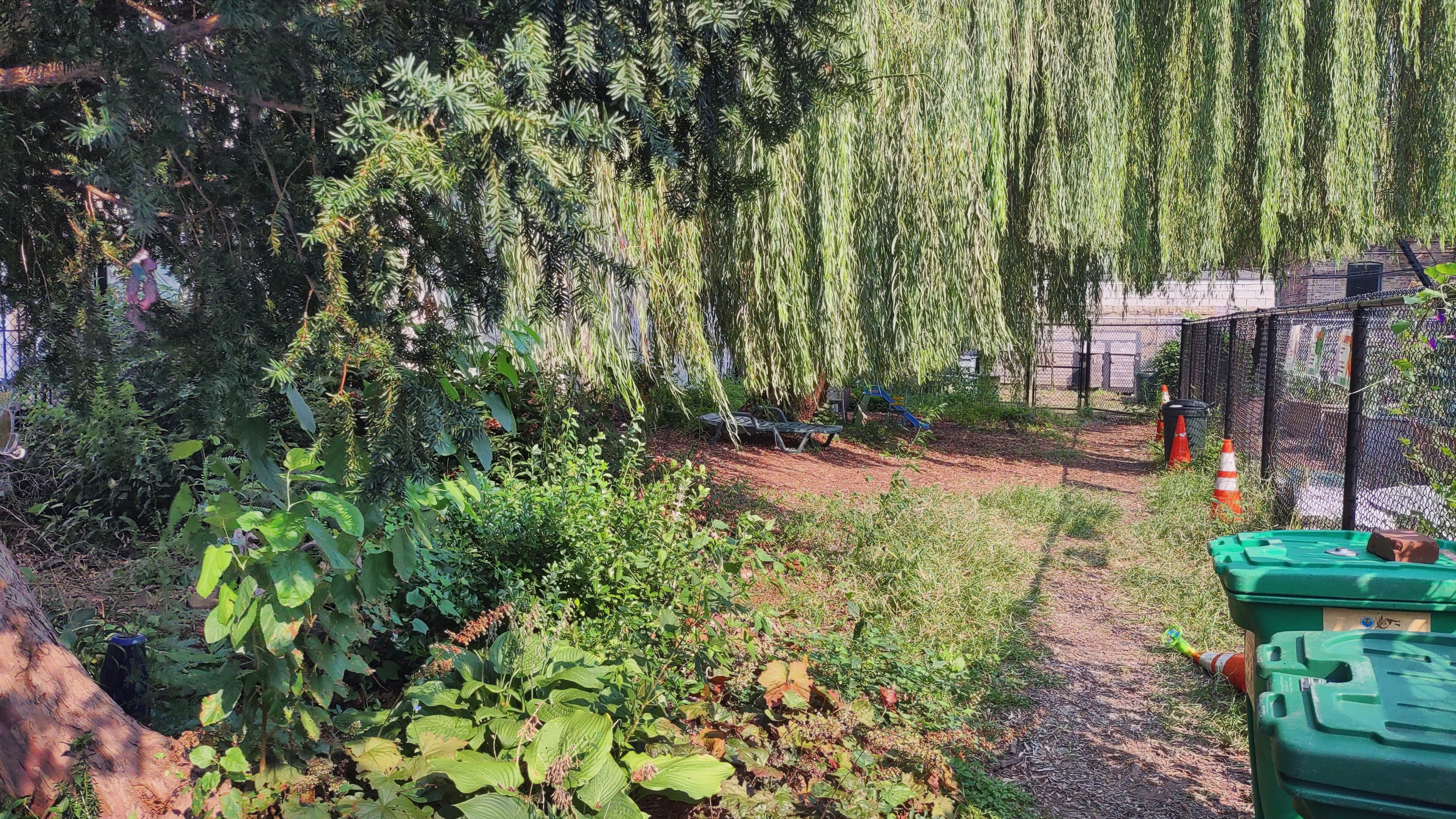
- The garden in 2021
- Interactive map of Maple Street Community Garden
- Type: Community garden

Maple Street Community Garden is a community garden in the Prospect Lefferts Gardens neighborhood of Brooklyn, New York City. It is located on Maple Street between Jean-Jacques Dessalines Boulevard and Nostrand Avenue.

== History ==
Maple Street Community Garden was founded on a vacant lot which formerly had an abandoned house that burned down in 1999. The garden was started by the Maple Street Block Association in 2012 with a $1,000 grant and later $4,800 from the City Council to clean the vacant lot. The lot was privately owned but the gardeners were unable to establish contact with the owners.

In September 2014, a limited liability company (LLC) owned by the Makhani brothers claimed to own the lot and tried to evict the gardeners. The LLC furnished a deed which claimed it to have purchased the home from heirs of the original owners. It was later discovered that the brothers had a shady real estate business. In July 2015, the gardeners were briefly barred from the site when the LLC acquired a restraining order. On November 6, 2015, the Brooklyn Supreme Court dismissed the ownership claim of the LLC and ordered an independent legal guardian to find the heirs of the property. In 2016, Brooklyn Borough President Eric Adams and neighborhood Councilman Mathieu Eugene set aside a budget for 2017 to acquire the property for $1.25 million and transfer it to the Parks Department. In 2017, the City Planning Commission approved the acquisition after going through the Uniform Land Use Review Procedure (ULURP).

In 2021, the garden launched its Fresh Food Box Program with GrowNYC. The garden plots are all gardened communally by members and any neighbor can help on harvest days.
