= 462 Halsey Community Farm =

Community farm in Brooklyn, New York

Coordinates: 40°40′59.7″N 73°56′8.4″W

462 Halsey Community Farm is a community farm in the Bedford-Stuyvesant neighborhood of Brooklyn, New York City. It is located on Halsey Street between Lewis Avenue and Marcus Garvey Boulevard.

== History ==
462 Halsey Community Farm was founded in 2012 in a lot that had been empty since the 1970s by Shatia Jackson and Kristen Bonardi Rapp. Jackson and Bonardi Rapp saw a sign posted to the lot's fence by the nonprofit 596 Acres and wanted to bring agriculture and organic food to the neighborhood. 596 Acres helped organizers navigate city agencies to gain access to the space making 462 Halsey the first lot secured through the nonprofit's advocacy.

The farm was initially organized to contain large public plots with additional member plots and a year-round compost drop-off. In 2014, the community farm was reorganized into a communal growing model to increase membership and better use the small space. Garden members created and installed a rain catchment system featuring a 1,550-gallon tank and five 50-gallon tanks which water the garden through a solar-powered drip-irrigation system.

462 Halsey also correlates the hands-on work in the farm with food equity and racial justice. In 2013, the community farm began working with GrowNYC to distribute its Fresh Food Box for low cost. In 2015, the group recognized the importance of the Black Lives Matter movement by posting a sign in support on their fence. In 2019, the farm organized a protest focusing on the Immigration and Customs Enforcement (ICE) raids and organized 30 other farms and gardens to join. During the COVID-19 pandemic in 2020, the farm began working with food pantries to bring healthy food to those food insecure in the community.

In 2015, the land was flagged as a potential site for affordable housing as a part of Mayor de Blasio’s 10-year plan to build 80,000 units of affordable housing. In 2016, the site was transferred to the Department of Parks and Recreation to remain a community greenspace.
