= Green Oasis Community Garden =

Community garden in Manhattan, New York

Coordinates: 40.7241°N 73.9773°W

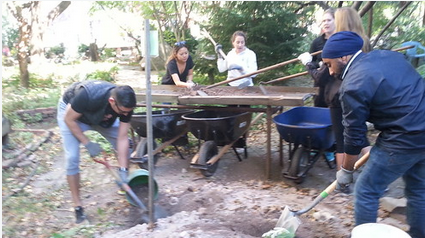

Green Oasis Community Garden & Gilbert's Sculpture Garden, also known as Green Oasis Community Garden, is a 17,787 square foot community garden and sculpture garden at 372 East 8th Street, located in the East Village of Manhattan, New York City.

== History ==
Green Oasis Community Garden was founded in 1981. With the neighborhood experiencing crime and decay in the preceding decades, the garden opened, alongside Gilbert’s Sculpture Garden, aiming to provide a safe, green space for all people, especially children. In addition, the garden created space for the community, offering a space to perform theater, poetry, and enjoy nature. Green Oasis Community Garden, founded by Norman Valee and Reinaldo Aranas, was created from five abandoned lots located on East 8th St between Avenues C & D. With the help of the community, the lots were cleared of rubble, dumped cars, and garbage to prepare for the garden.

The Green Oasis Community Garden fought for survival when the local Manhattan Community Board 3 did not back its application to be spared from development. In response, the gardener's organized, eventually prevailing with community support.

A community volunteer organization hosts monthly clean-ups at the Green Oasis Community Garden.

== Features and Usage ==
The garden's tree specimens include a giant Blue Atlas Cedar, cherry and mulberry trees, and crepe myrtles. In addition, Green Oasis has bee hives and a koi pond.

In 1987, the movie Batteries Not Included was filmed across the street from the garden. The garden space was used as a staging area. At the conclusion of the movie, the people in the community used the money gained from the rental to purchase the gazebo that still stands there today.

=== Gilbert’s Sculpture Garden ===
John Gilbert Ingram Sr., the superintendent of the building across from Valle and Arenas, created a sculpture garden, seeing the open lot as an ideal spot to fulfill his lifelong interest in sculpting. Gilbert’s Sculpture Garden merged in the 1990s with its neighbor, Green Oasis, to create one of the most child-friendly gardens in NYC.

== See also ==
- Community Gardens in New York City
- Community gardening in the United States
