= Brooklyn Queens Land Trust =

Nonprofit organization based in New York City

Brooklyn Queens Land Trust (BQLT) is a non-profit organization dedicated to the conservation, preservation, and creation of community gardens in Brooklyn and Queens, New York.

== Organization history ==
In the winter of 1998, New York City mayor Rudy Giuliani announced that 114 community gardens would be auctioned off in May 1999, claiming that the city would benefit from the land sale and the additional housing to be built on the real estate. After months of public protests and a lawsuit headed by a group of gardeners and State Attorney General Eliot Spitzer, the auction was stopped and a deal was negotiated for the Trust for Public Land (TPL) and the New York Restoration Project to purchase 112 of the gardens.

On March 21, 2004, the Brooklyn Queens Land Trust was chartered and incorporated as a 501(c)(3) organization to manage 34 gardens, 29 in Brooklyn and 5 in Queens, with a plan to own those gardens. The Manhattan Land Trust and the Bronx Land Trust were chartered at the same time. Demetrice Mills was the first president of the organization, and in 2012, the TPL signed over the deeds of 32 gardens to the Brooklyn Queens Land Trust.

In 2016, the Trust collaborated with the Brooklyn Public Library on an oral history project featuring several garden founders.

== Organizational structure ==
The Trust comprises a 15-member Board of Directors and has over 600 volunteer gardeners. They operate through a grassroots structure, with each Member Garden being operated by a group of gardeners, who elect one to two representatives who act on behalf of their garden, either by voting at meetings or serving on the board of directors.

== Conservation work ==
The Brooklyn Queens Land Trust maintains its gardens in physical and legal ways, including providing liability insurance, managing property paperwork, connecting gardens to the city water system, and making physical repairs to gardens.

In 2016, the Trust received funding from The New York Community Trust to implement the Neighborhood Coalitions Project, which promoted sustainable growing practices and healthy eating through community development events. That same year, they also began the CIRCLE Initiative, with funding from the Land Trust Alliance, which conducted tree inventories and soil testing and implemented composting, rain harvesting, and beekeeping projects.
