= CAMBA, Inc. =

Nonprofit organization in New York, U.S.

- President: Joanne Oplustil
- Website: https://camba.org

CAMBA, Inc. is a Brooklyn-based nonprofit organization that provides social services to New Yorkers in need. CAMBA's 160 program sites provides healthcare, education and youth development, family support, legal services and housing services to 45,000 New Yorkers every year.

== History ==
CAMBA, which stands for Church Avenue Merchant Block Association, was founded in 1977 as a merchant association in Flatbush that worked to reduce crime and beautify the community. Since then, the organization has expanded to offer services to a growing population of immigrants and refugees.

In 1982, Joanne M. Oplustil became CAMBA's CEO and she continues to serve in that role today. In 2022, Oplustil received more than more than $750,000 in compensation from CAMBA.

== Housing services ==
In the model of settlement housing, CAMBA created the affiliated nonprofit, CAMBA Housing Ventures, in 2005 to offer affordable and supportive housing to New Yorkers in housing crisis.

CAMBA offers housing services that targets those who are currently homeless or who are at risk of being homeless. HomeBase collects a variety of data (from housing court, pending evictions, and other sources) to pinpoint households in Brooklyn and Staten Island where tenants are facing eviction. CAMBA HomeBase staff will then go into those neighborhoods—oftentimes in an outfitted RV called the You Can Van—and offer housing assistance before a housing crisis occurs.

CAMBA Housing Ventures pairs attractive and sustainable spaces with case management services for low-income and formerly homeless individuals and families.

Adult, drop-in and family shelters are also operated by CAMBA across Brooklyn.

== See also ==
- Homelessness
- Social services
- Poverty in the United States
- List of New York City Block and Neighborhood Associations
