= List of New York City Block and Neighborhood Associations =

Neighborhood non-profit organizations

Block Associations and Neighborhood Associations in New York City are non-profit organizations. A block party requires that an applicant must have a block association membership and the supporting signatures of the majority of block residents.

== The Bronx ==
- Clinton Avenue Block Association

== Brooklyn ==
- The Park Place – Underhill Avenue Block Association
- CAMBA, Inc. (Church Avenue Merchant Block Association))
- Maple Street Block Association
- Green Avenue Block Association
- 100 Jefferson Avenue Block Association
- Norman Street Block Association
- The Vermont Street 700 Block Association

F Block K

== Manhattan ==
- Gramercy Park Block Association
- Manhattan Community Board 2 Block and Neighborhood Associations
- Manhattan Community Board 3 Block and Neighborhood Associations
- Manhattan Community Board 4 Block and Neighborhood Associations
- 10th and Stuyvesant Streets Block Association
- West80s Neighborhood Association
- Avenue A Block Association
- United Block Association
- East Fifth Street Block Association
- West 111th Street Block Association

== Queens ==
- Richmond Hill Block Association
- Woodhaven Residents' Block Association

== Staten Island ==
- Wheeler Avenue Block Association
- Wellbrook Ave. Block Association

== See also ==
- Business improvement districts in the United States§New York
