= East New York Farms =

Community organization

East New York Farms! (ENYF) is a community organization created to address food justice issues in the East New York neighborhood of Brooklyn, New York.

== History ==
Following the disinvestment and neglect of the neighborhood in the 1960s and 1970s, the Pratt Center for Community Development and local organizations collaborated in 1995 to identify needs of the neighborhood including: more safe green spaces, income generating opportunities, retail, and better opportunities for youth. East New York Farms! was established in 1998 and became a program of United Community Centers (UCC) in 2007.

== Urban agriculture ==
East New York Farms! consists of a network of two urban farms, UCC Youth Farm and the Pink Houses Community Farm, and a community garden, Fresh Farm, to grow produce for the farmers market. A majority of the families in East New York are Black and Hispanic with approximately 35% being immigrants, many of whom have agricultural backgrounds. The agricultural spaces grow a variety of crops from the farmers' and gardeners' cultural heritages, including the West Indies, West Africa, and Asia. The diversity of crops make the farmers market rare in the Northeastern United States.

The farms regularly host workshops, tours and cooking demonstrations.

=== UCC Youth Farm ===
The UCC Youth Farm (40.6654°N 73.8868°W) was established in 2000 and is located New Lots Ave and Schenck Ave. It is managed by 35 youth aged 13–15 from East New York who are selected for 9-month paid internships at the farm. The program is intended to teach participants how to run an organic farm, and how to provide support to other gardeners. By using food and food justice as the catalyst, participants also learn about the environment, health & nutrition, entrepreneurship, and leadership.

In 2012, the farm worked with the NYC Department of Education to establish soil safety standards. In 2016, the farm partnered with the Farm School NYC to offer the Farm Intensive Certificate program, a 7 month urban farm training.

=== Pink Houses Community Farm ===
The Pink Houses Community Farm (40.6679°N 73.8643°W) is located at the Pink Houses, a public housing development owned by the New York City Housing Authority. The half-acre farm opened in 2015 as a partnership between Pink Houses Resident Green Committee and ENYF. Produce is distributed to residents of the development weekly in the community center.\

== See also ==
- Community gardens in New York City
- Community gardening in the United States
