= Esperanza Garden =

Community garden in New York City

Coordinates: 40°43′28″N 73°58′45″W

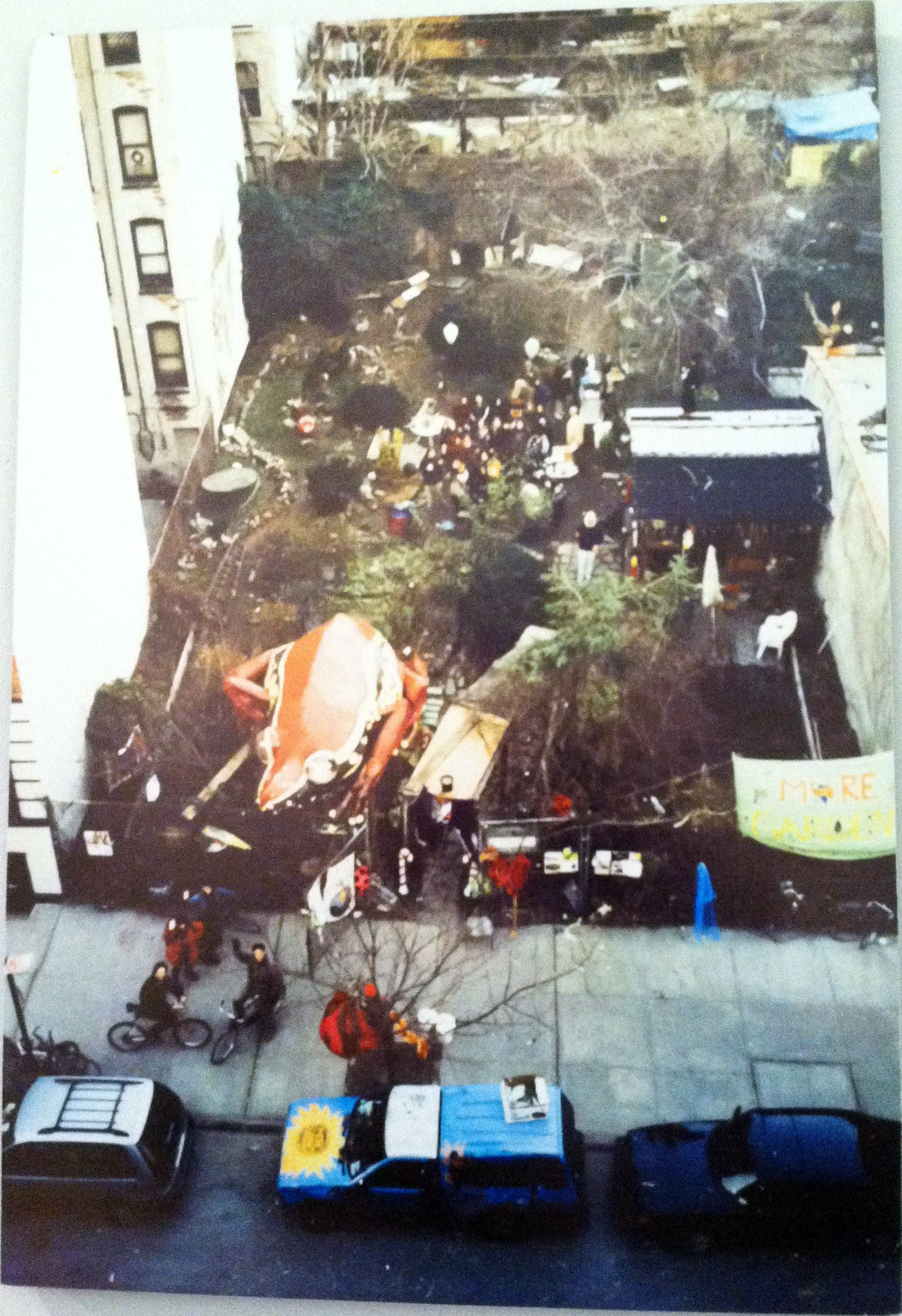
This aerial view of the Esperanza Garden shows activists, pre-demolition, at the garden, along with the garden's beloved Coquí.

Jardin de la Esperanza or Esperanza Garden was a community garden started in 1978 by Alecia Torres, a resident of New York City's Lower East Side. The garden began when Torres cleared rubble and trash out of an empty lot on East 7th Street, close to Avenue C in the East Village of Manhattan. The garden, later on, became a community space for growing medicinal plants, tending chickens, and a safe space for children to play.

== Background ==
On February 15, 2000, Ezparanza Garden was demolished by the city government, after an ongoing feud between community residents and the Giuliani administration. New York City Parks describes this feud as:

"The battle between development and preserving open space, a perennial tension in cities across the world and not limited just to community gardens in New York, culminated in an agreement brokered by then–Attorney General Eliot Spitzer and the City to preserve more than 400 sites across the five boroughs, either leaving them under the jurisdiction of City agencies or transferring them to the Parks Department. (That left approximately 150 parcels open to eventual development for New York's housing needs.)"

The demolition of the Garden was accompanied by the destruction of two-thirds, and 17-year-long closure, of the Carmen Pabon del Amanecer Garden (Carmen's Garden) on Ave C. The destruction of these gardens was brought on by real estate developer Donald Capoccia, who bought the lots when the Giuliani administration put them up for public auction in the late 1990s. Capoccia's firm, BFC Partners, partially funded Mayor Giuliani's political campaign, and brokered a 1999 deal with then Council Member Margarita Lopez that saved Carmen's Garden and the mural inside of it—titled "From One Generation to Another 1984" by John Weber.

== Demolition ==
Beginning in 1999, and especially after receiving a 5-day demolition notice, activists, gardeners, and community organizers gathered to try and save the garden through direct action. According to Swarthmore's Global Nonviolent Action Database, these activists organized community events and watches so that at least two people would be in the garden 24 hours a day. They built and designed a giant Coquí, a symbol of Puerto Rico associated with a legend of resistance. On the day of the demolition, February 15, 2000, a call went out to a network of community residents who were willing to risk arrests. By 7am, 150 people showed up in protest, many of them locking themselves to the fence, the Coquí, and other garden landmarks.

The same day as the demolition Attorney General Eliot Spitzer put in place a temporary restraining order against the City that, at 2pm that same day, protected community gardens from demolition and auctioning by the city. Spitzer argued that the lots could be sold only after a state environmental review or an act of the Legislature.
