= Morning Glory Community Garden =

Community garden in the Bronx

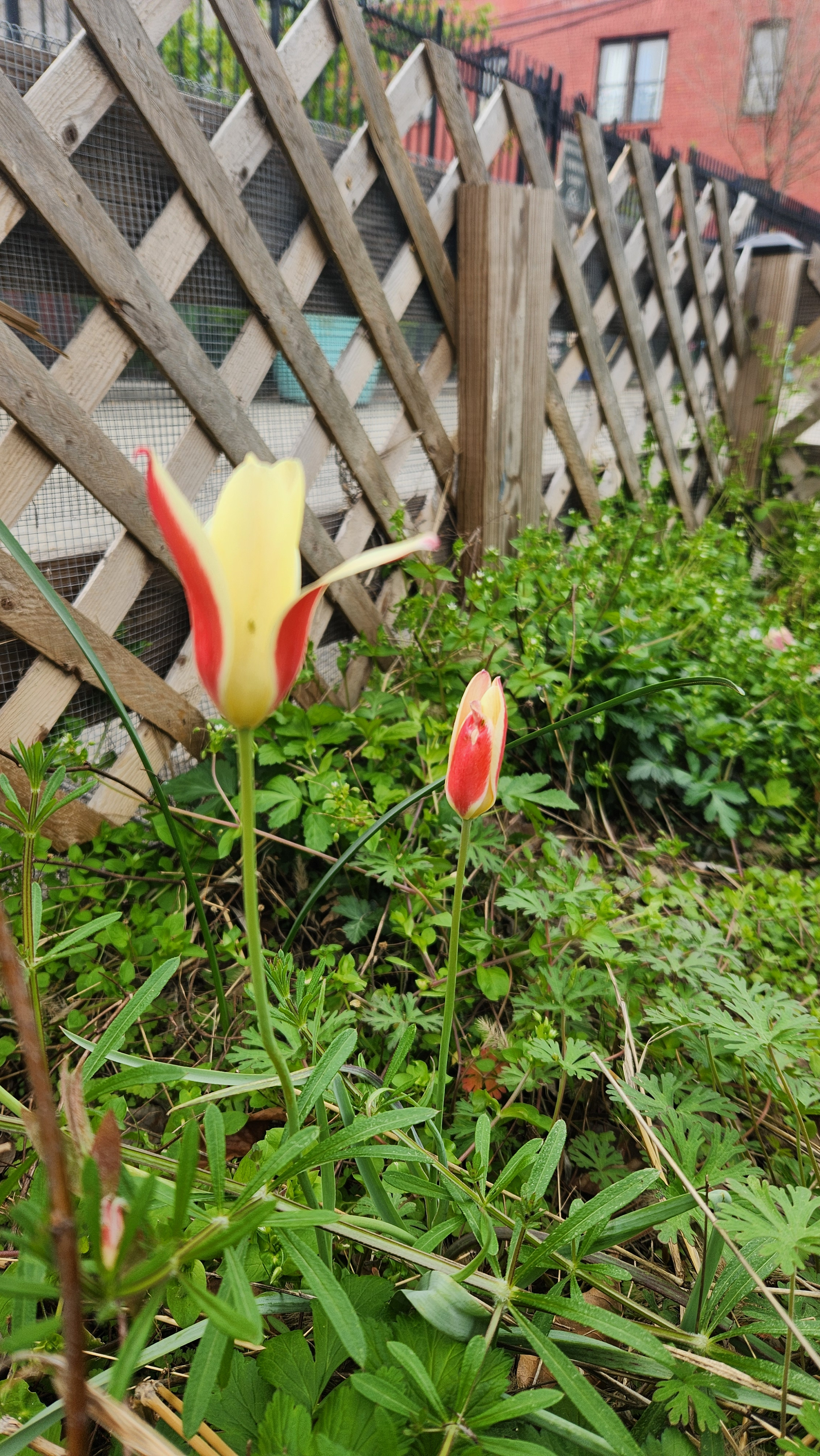
- Location: 1221 Hoe Avenue, Bronx, New York City 10459
- Established: 2014
- Website: morningglorybx.com

Morning Glory Community Garden is a 10,286 square foot urban farm and community garden in the Crotona Park East neighborhood of the South Bronx.

== History ==
From 2009 to 2011, Morning Glory Community Garden was a community garden located at 149th Street and Southern Boulevard in the South Bronx. In 2014, Morning Glory Community Garden was officially allotted a space as part of the Gardens for Healthy Communities Program within the New York City Mayor's Obesity Task Force Initiative and relocated to its present location on Hoe Avenue.

In 2016, to increase access to affordable, nutritious produce, Morning Glory Garden created a harvest box program, in which Bronx residents could enroll and purchase biweekly deliveries of organic produce from mid-April to November. Since 2020, the harvest boxes have been free and available for pickup for any Bronx resident.

Morning Glory Garden is currently supported predominantly by volunteers who aim to increase food production and distribution in the South Bronx as well as create a safe place for people and families to grow and learn together in a garden.

== Garden features ==
Morning Glory Garden has built a variety of features and amenities. There are raised beds of different heights, a Casita, a Shade Structure, and an aerated static pile compost system. There is rainwater harvesting off the roofs of the Casita and Shade Structure as well as a full solar system that powers an irrigation system. Perennial fruits including pears, cherries, peaches, figs, strawberries, raspberries and blackberries are also grown.

A key feature of the garden is its reliance on composting.

== Community projects ==
Morning Glory Garden is a space where adults and children gather to learn, celebrate, and play. It has hosted various community events including clothing swaps, story hours, and workshops covering topics such as planting, natural dyeing, and herbal remedies.

A section of Morning Glory Garden is dedicated to growing produce for the Bronx Community. It shares this produce with the community in the form of Harvest Boxes. A harvest box typically includes a variety of greens, herbs, vegetables and fruits, based on what is seasonally available.
