= Open Road Park =

Public park in Manhattan, New York

Coordinates: 40.72941°N 73.98304°W

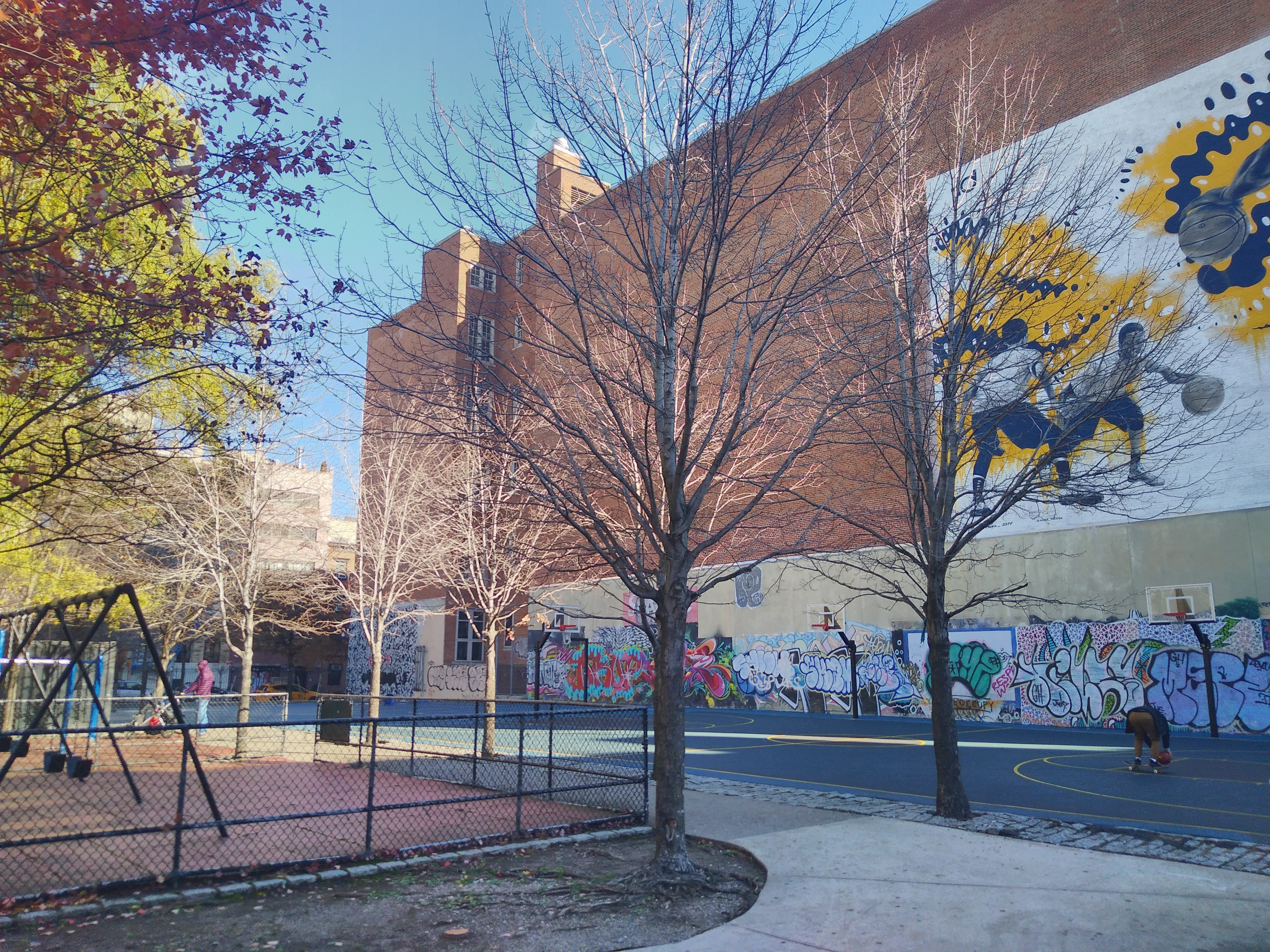
The playground in December 2020.

Open Road Park is a small park in East Village, Manhattan, New York City, located east of First Avenue between 11th and 12th Streets. It is among the larger green spaces created in the East Village as a result of community organizing. The site of this park was taken over in 1993 by Open Road, a neighborhood nonprofit that developed the lot into a community garden and playground. Prior to its use as a park, the site was used for many purposes that reflect on the history of the surrounding neighborhood.

== Cemetery ==
In 1833, East 11th Street was regarded as the northern periphery of New York City and selected as the city's third Roman Catholic cemetery after the older burial ground at Old Patrick's Cathedral on Mott Street reached its capacity. After interring 41,016 individuals, the Catholic Cemetery reached its limit by August 1848, and the church then began burying its members at Calvary Cemetery in Queens. For the following four decades, the cemetery gradually fell into disuse and was subject to vandalism.

In 1883, the church proposed selling the property and re-interring its dead at Calvary Cemetery. Relatives of the deceased filed a lawsuit to prevent the disinterment, and the sale was put on hold. In 1907, the church again decided to sell the cemetery. By then, the value of the land had greatly increased while the surrounding neighborhood was no longer dominated by Catholic residents. After the last bodies were disinterred in 1909, the site was sold three years later to the New York City Board of Education and the Fifth Avenue Coach Company.

== Park ==
The eastern part of the property was developed as Public School 60, presently East Side Community High School; and Mary Help of Christians Church, which stood until 2013. The rest was developed as a garage for public buses. When the garage was demolished in 1987, it left a contaminated vacant lot that was sought by Open Road as a potential park. In 1993, with funding from the city Department of Sanitation, the nonprofit had the lot covered with a liner, which was then covered with gravel, soil, and compost in advance of its development as a garden. Two years later, a greenhouse and turtle pond were constructed with the assistance of local high school students. The pond receives some of its water through a bioswale design that collects rainwater throughout the garden. The northern two-thirds of the site was developed as a playground. With the support of the Trust for Public Land, the site was purchased to save it from development.

Open Road Park was acquired by the Parks Department in 2003, continuing its development as a recreational space. In memory of the victims of the September 11 attacks, the garden is a participant in the USDA Forest Service Living Memorials Project. The memorial garden was designed in partnership between Cornell University, Open Road, and the USDA Forest Service. In March 2015, with the support of the New York Red Bulls soccer team and the U.S. Soccer Foundation, ground was broken on a mini-soccer pitch at the playground.

As residential development in the East Village continues to increase in the 21st century, the preservation of Open Road Park ensures that residents will have ample space for sports along with opportunities for students to learn about nature by actively participating in the maintenance of the park's garden. The playground includes basketball courts, a soccer pitch, and swings.

Circa 2016, the garden was reorganized under the name East Side Outside Community Garden and incorporated a compost program run by Reclaimed Organics. East Side Outside Community Garden is part of the New York City Department of Parks and Recreation GreenThumb Program.
