= Sumner Houses =

Public housing development in Brooklyn, New York

- NYCHA Property
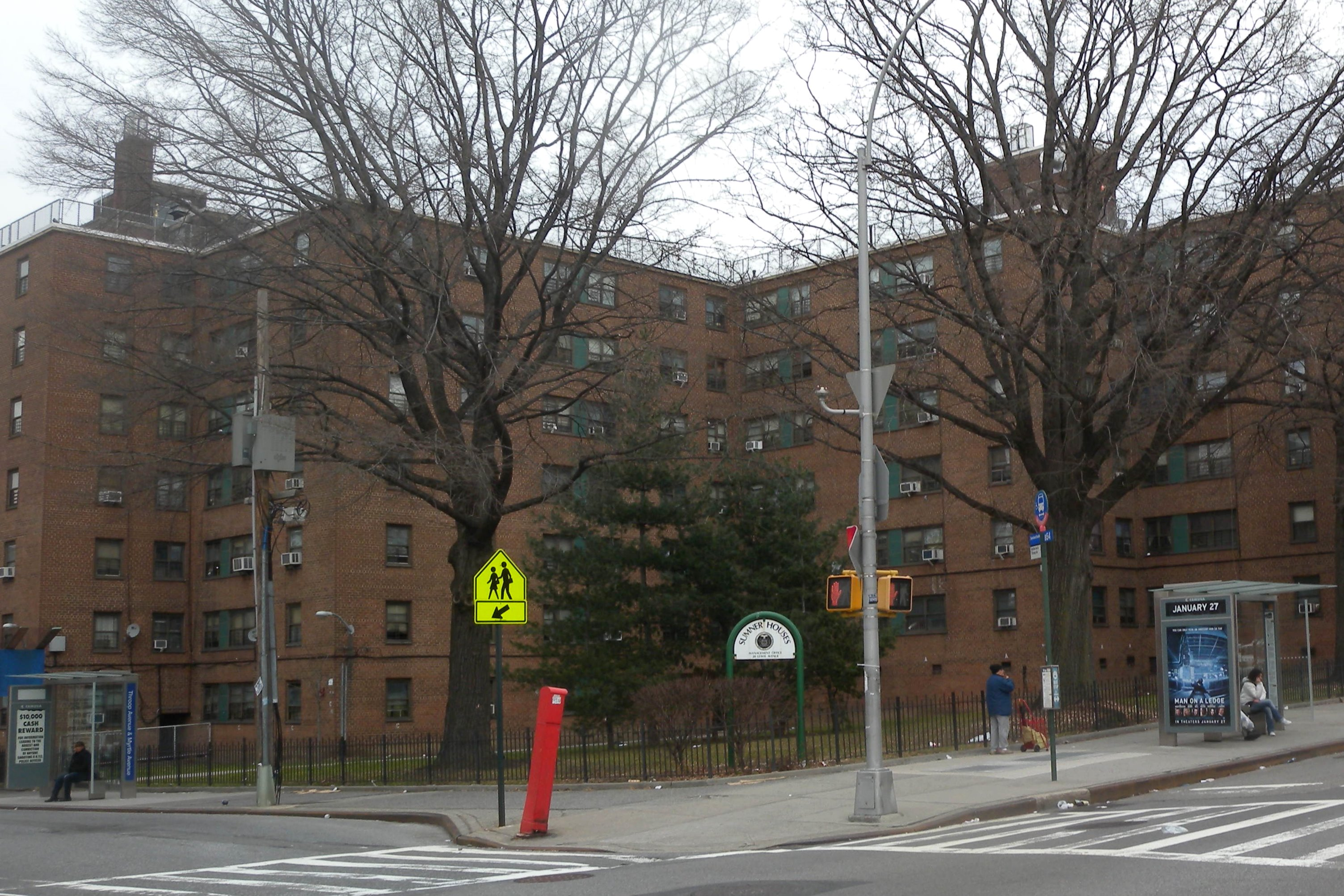
- Interactive map of Sumner Houses
- Coordinates: 40.6975°N 73.9411°W
- Country: United States
- State: New York
- City: New York City
- Borough: Brooklyn

Area
  - Total: 20.45 acres (8.28 ha)

Population
  - Total: 2,013
- Zip Code: 11206

The Sumner Houses is a NYCHA housing project that has 13 buildings. Buildings I-III, V-X, XII, and XIII have 7 stories while only buildings IV and XI have 12 stories. It is located between Park and Myrtle Avenues, and also between Lewis Avenue/Corner of Broadway to Throop Avenue in Bed-Stuy, Brooklyn.

== History ==
This housing project was built between 1955 and 1956 along with PS 59. It was named after Sumner Avenue, the north–south street that runs through the middle of the complex, which originally got its name from Charles Sumner and was renamed after Marcus Garvey in 1986. The housing project was designed by architect Gustave W. Iser for about $16.6M.

In 2024, a new 11-story mixed-use building providing affordable housing for seniors opened at the complex, which is called Atrium at Sumner and was designed by the architecture firm of Studio Libeskind. The project was an infill development.

== See also ==
- New York City Housing Authority
