= Chico Mendez Mural Garden =

Coordinates: 40.7278°N 73.9802°W

The Chico Mendez Mural Garden was a community garden located on the East Village of Manhattan in New York City. Named after Brazilian environmentalist and activist Chico Mendes, the garden was demolished on December 31, 1997.

== History ==
The East Village's Mendez Mural Community Garden (11th Street between Avenues A and B) was created in the early 1990s through the work of sculptor Ken Hiratsuka and muralist 'Chico.' Chico and others brought trees, plants and art to the space which had been a vacant lot since the early 1970s. The park grew without city support in a neighborhood that had suffered in previous years from violence and drug-crime. It was widely utilized by people in the neighborhood and became a fixture in the community. In 1996, the city exercised their claim of ownership on the land and Mayor Rudy Giuliani decided to sell the land to real-estate developers. A community uproar and protest followed the decision. In the end, the attempt to save the garden failed. On New Year's Eve 1997, the land was bulldozed for condominiums.

== See also ==
- Community Gardens in New York City
- Community gardening in the United States
