= Carmen Pabón del Amanecer Jardín =

Community garden in Manhattan, New York

Coordinates: 40.7245°N 73.9788°W

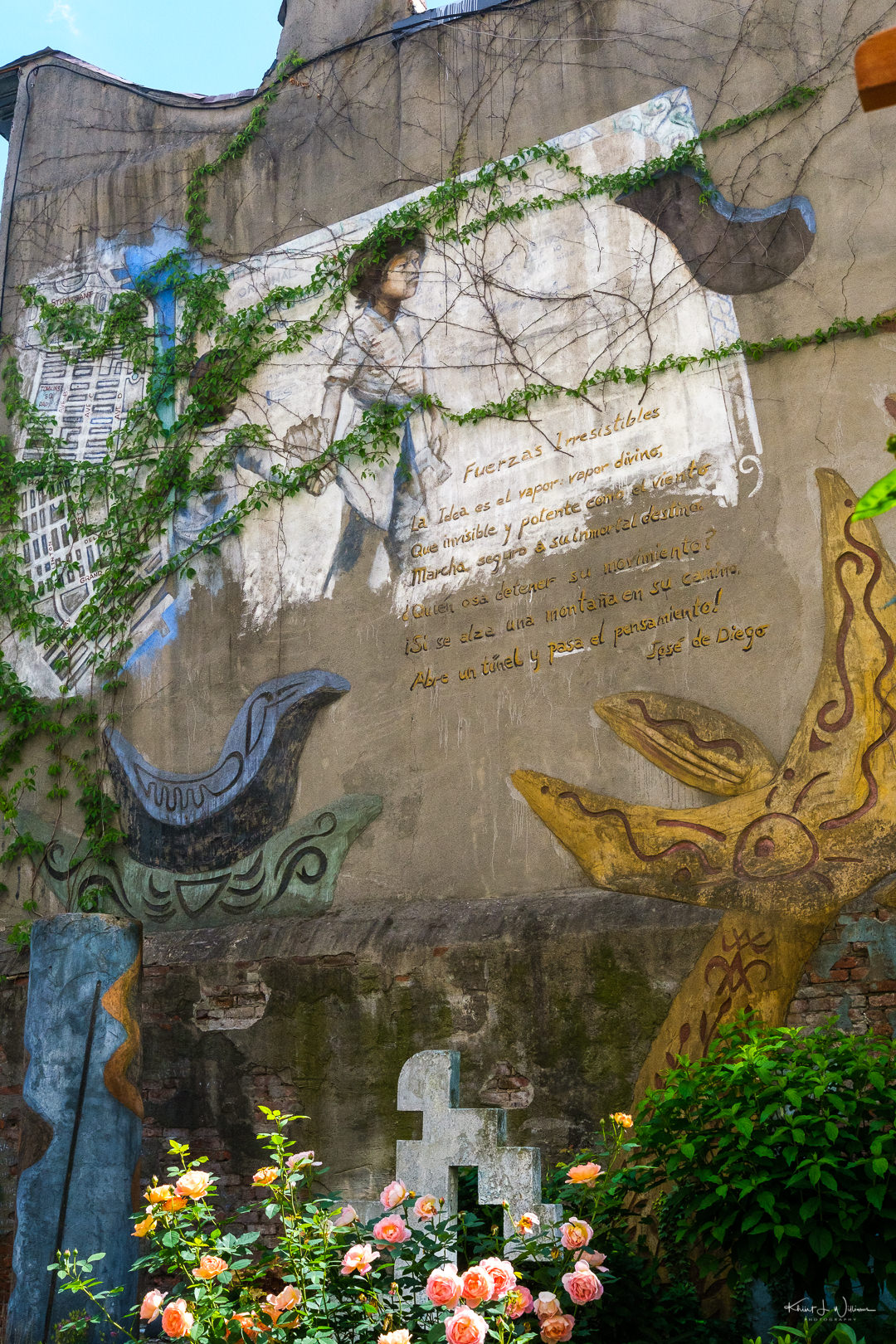
Mural at Carmen Pabón del Amanecer Jardín

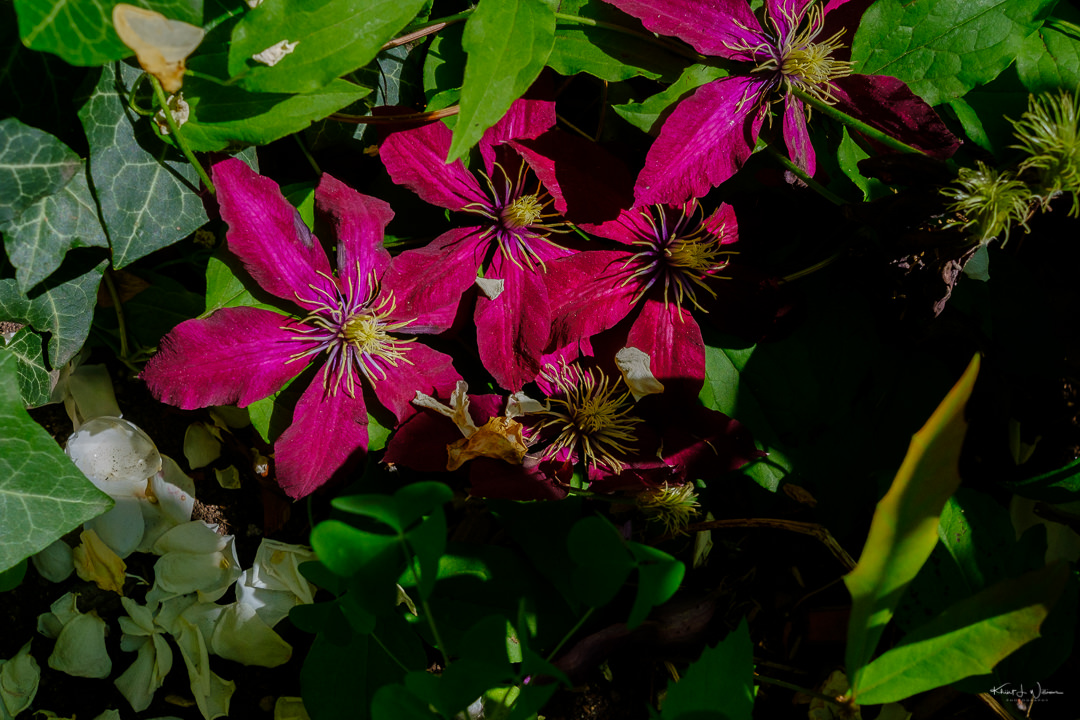
Clematis growing at Carmen Pabón del Amanecer Jardín

Carmen Pabón del Amanecer Jardín, also known as Carmen's Garden and El Bello Amanecer Boriqueño Garden, is a 4,635-square-foot (430.6 m^{2}) community garden at 117 Avenue C, in the East Village of Manhattan, New York City. Carmen Pabón del Amanecer Jardín is named after Carmen Pabon, a Lower East Side poet and gardener who died in 2016 at the age of 95.

== History ==
The garden was created by Pabon in the late 1970s on a vacant lot. Pabon and local volunteers cleared the vacant lot and planted flowers. Pabon held poetry readings and ran a soup kitchen to fed the homeless. The garden space was closed in 2000 due to the construction of the apartment complex next door. After being closed for 17 years, Carmen's Garden was re-opened in 2016, with Carmen Pabón cutting the ribbon not long before her death.

== See also ==
- Community Gardens in New York City
- Community gardening in the United States
