= Community gardens in New York City =

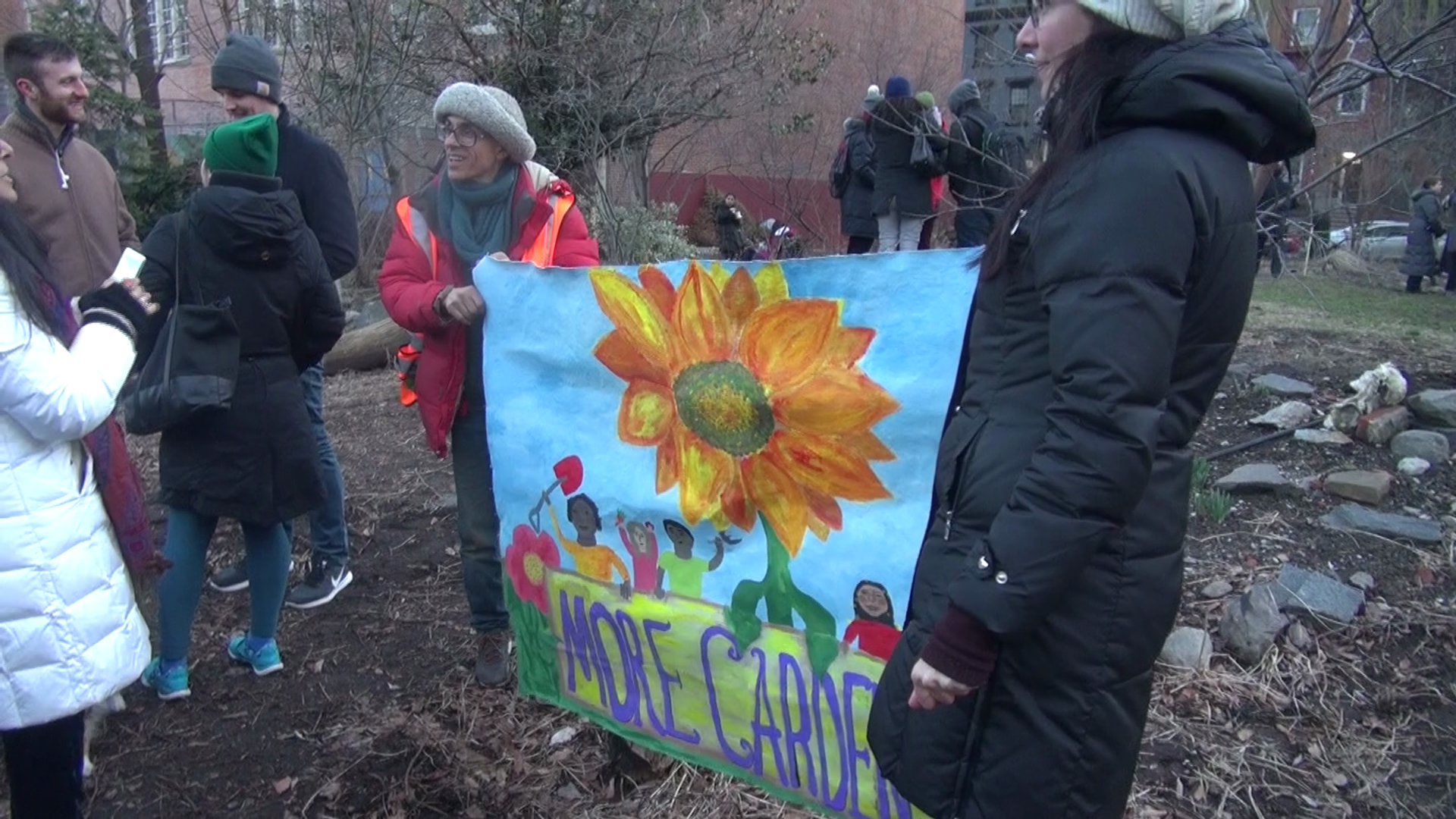
Aresh Javadi showing a "More Gardens" poster at the Chaharshanbe Suri at El Jardin Paraiso in 2018

There are over 550 community gardens on city property, over 745 school gardens, over 100 gardens in land trusts, and over 700 gardens at public housing developments throughout New York City. The community gardens are maintained by city residents who steward the often underutilized land. The community garden movement in NYC began on the Lower East Side during the disrepair of the 1960s on vacant, unused land. These first gardens were tended without governmental permission or assistance.

== History ==
=== Early gardening programs ===
In 1895, the first gardens were founded in New York City by a committee of the New York Association for Improving the Condition of the Poor (AICP). The committee promoted the idea of gardening on vacant lots following the success of the first community gardening program in Detroit as a way to address food insecurity and lessen the reliance on charities and taxpayers. The committee also advocated for gardens as a way to develop skills in the hopes that gardeners would relocate to the country. The gardens were located in Long Island City on 7,200 city lots donated by William Steinway. Allotments for the roughly 100 families who tended the land ranged from one-quarter of an acre to eight acres. By the end of the first season, the program was deemed a success, growing $11,000 worth of produce with a clear profit margin for farmers. In 1898, the AICP published a report about the gardening program as an ideal solution to unemployment and listed similar projects in nineteen cities.

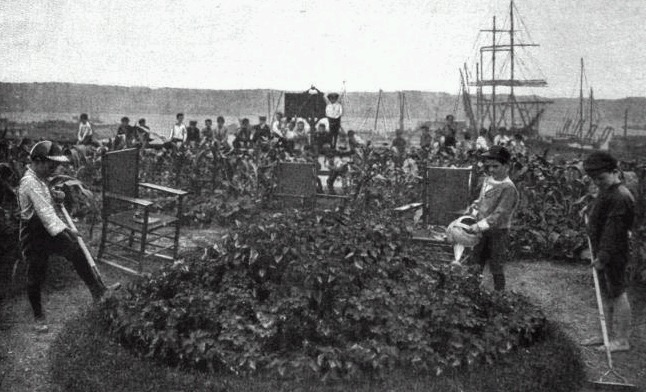
DeWitt Clinton Park garden area in 1906 with the unobstructed views of the Palisades

As adult interest in gardens began to wane, there was a renewed interest in children's gardening with the advocacy of Fannie Griscom Parsons in New York City. In DeWitt Clinton Park, Parsons created a large educational garden in the 1902 as a way to "show how willing and anxious children are to work, and to teach them in their work some necessary civic virtues; private care of public property, economy, honesty, application concentration, self-government, civic pride, justice, the dignity of labor, and the love of nature by opening to their minds the little we know of her mysteries, more wonderful than any fairy tale." By 1911, St. Nicolas Park, Highbridge Park, Colonial Park, and Thomas Jefferson Park all hosted school gardens following the success in DeWitt Clinton Park. In 1917, New York City schools reported gardens on school grounds, parks, vacant lots, and home gardens.

=== Community gardening movement ===
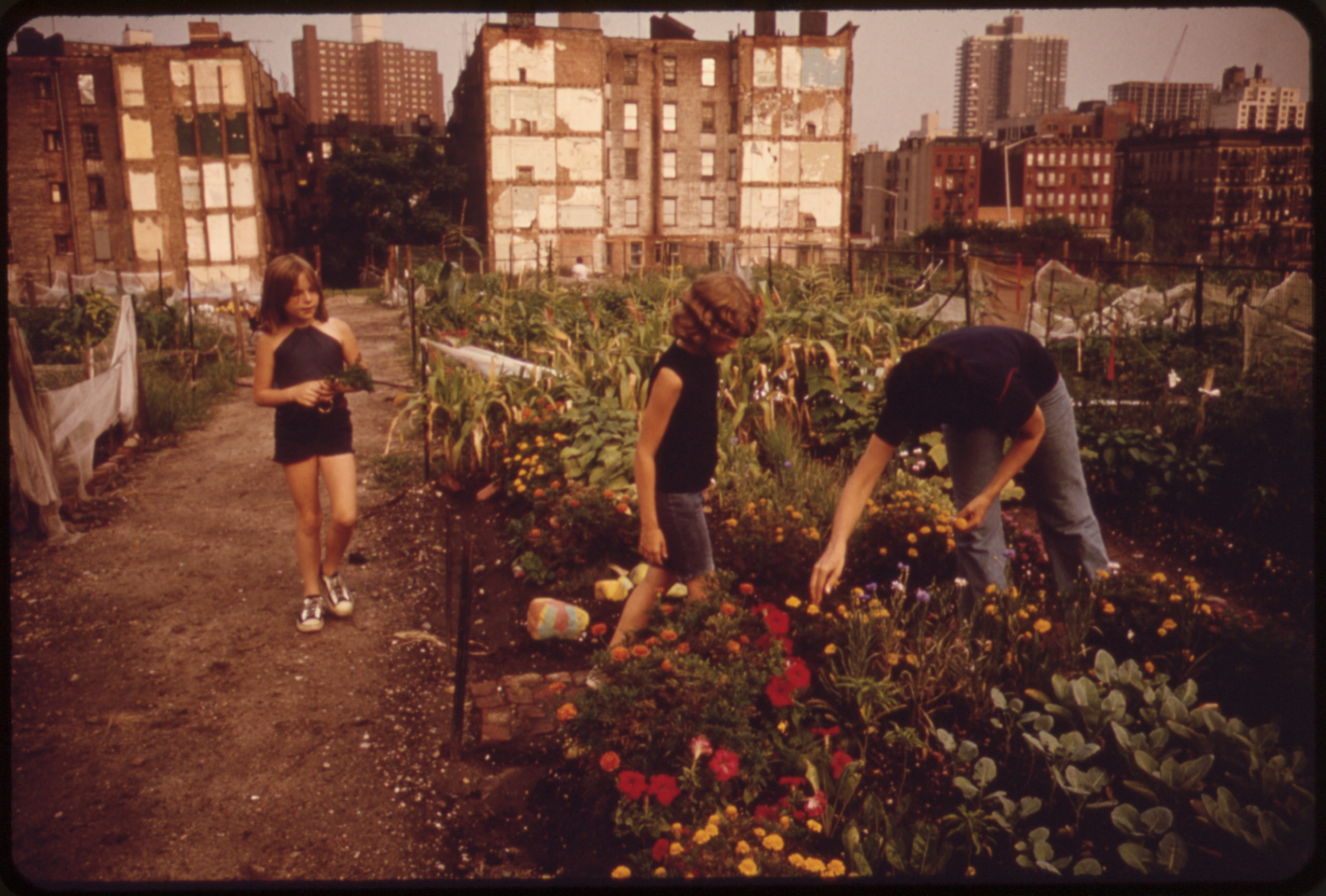
Manhattan farmers cultivate their thriving garden on the former site of a brewery from 92nd to 93rd Street and from 2nd to 3rd Avenue, 1970.

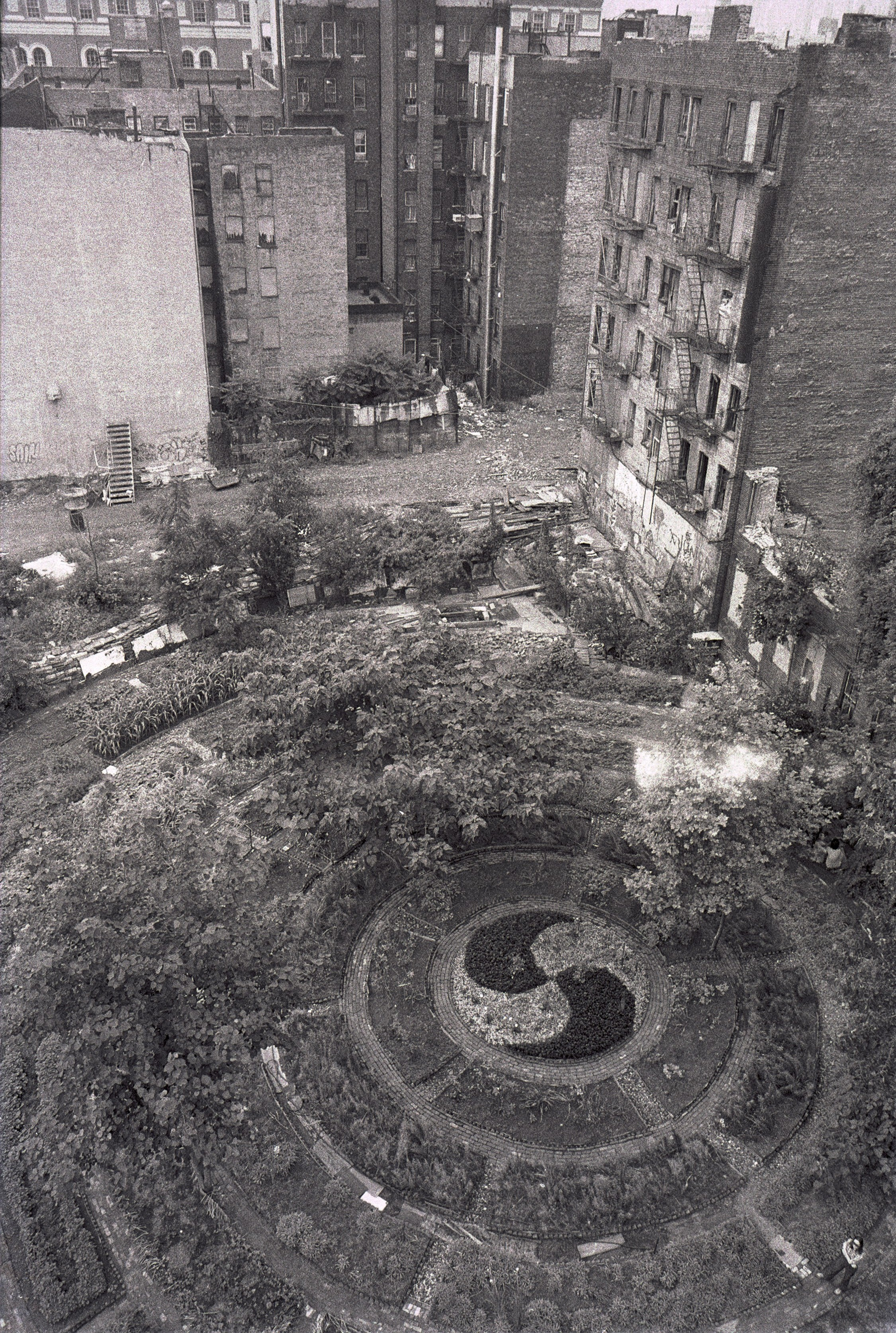
Above view of Adam Purple's "Urban Garden" on the Lower East Side of Manhattan in 1984.

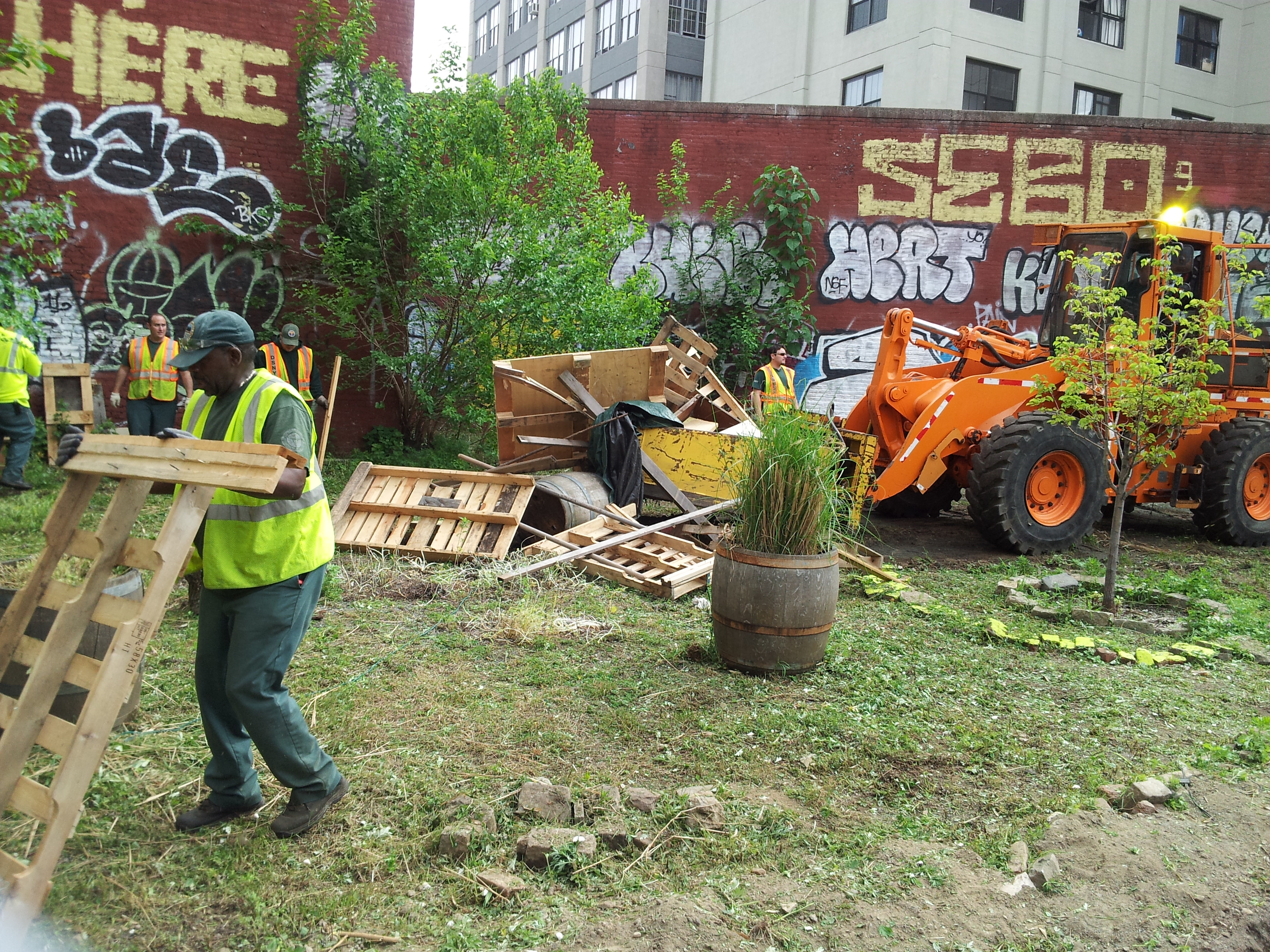
Nothing Yet Community Garden one day after announcing it was sold to a developer, May 22, 2013

In the 1960s and 1970s, New York City was experiencing a fiscal crisis and disinvestment resulting from white flight, bankruptcy, and corruption. Buildings were abandoned or allowed to fall into disrepair throughout the city. The city then claimed these properties when they defaulted on their loans and were often destroyed through demolition, decay and arson which led to vacant spaces that gardens would later claim. During this time, roughly 11,000 vacant lots transferred from private to public ownership. Neighborhood residents began to create gardens on this vacant land, without city sanction or government assistance. In 1962, one of the first gardens, El Jardín del Paraíso, was formed by Puerto Rican residents on the Lower East Side.

In 1962, the New York City Housing Authority (NYCHA) started the Citywide Resident Garden Competition, providing resources to NYCHA residents to see who could grow the best gardens. The program has since been renamed the Garden and Greening Awards Competition.

In 1973, the Green Guerillas were formed and began to throw “seed green-aids” to beautify vacant lots. They eventually turned their attention to a vacant lot at Bowery and Houston Streets which became the Liz Christy Garden, the first city-sanctioned community garden in 1974. After investing time as squatters, gardeners advocated for formal recognition and the Department of Parks and Recreation created GreenThumb in 1978 to provide resources and license community gardens. By 1985, there were an estimated 1,000 gardens in New York City.

In 1994, Mayor Rudy Giuliani was inducted after running on a platform of fighting crime, reducing homelessness, and privatizing public land and services. After declaring a housing crisis, Giuliani supported developing vacant lots, including ones with gardens citing the licenses with the gardens established them as interim-use spaces and would eventually be developed into housing. A majority of the proposed units were market rate, with only 20 percent available for moderate-income households. This created a controversy between the administration and city-greening advocates.

In January 1999, 114 gardens were put up for public auction without input from the community usually provided by the Uniform Land Use Review Procedure (ULURP). There were no use restrictions placed on these lots and local coalitions were formed in opposition staging demonstrations, participating in political events, utilizing formal approaches such as lawsuits, and built networks. 112 of the gardens were purchased by two land-trust organizations, New York Restoration Project and the Trust for Public Land. A second proposed sale of over 600 gardens included land use restrictions that developers needed to use some of the land for 'civic functions.' In 2000, the city sent bulldozers to level an unprotected Esperanza Garden, a community garden located on the Lower East Side, which was founded in 1978. The leveling of the garden caused concern from the New York State Democratic Committee citing campaign contributions given to Giuliani during his campaign for mayor from the developer proposing to build on the site. Attorney General Eliot Spitzer also opposed the administration by recommending that state environmental review or an act of the Legislature be required before the sale of community gardens.

In 2002, Mayor Michael Bloomberg settled the lawsuit by Spitzer, which preserved 500 gardens by placing them in the jurisdiction of City agencies, leaving approximately 150 gardens open for development. The success of the preservation of the gardens is due to reframing the conflict as a quality of life issue rather than a housing vs. gardens argument. Gardeners also framed the threat of development as a threat to their communities, citing that gardens were a space where a diverse population was able to work together while building community and becoming a larger voice to the city together.

In early 2015, Mayor Bill de Blasio made plans to build housing on over 40 city-owned sites housing community gardens citing the need for affordable housing. These gardens had signed interim-use agreements with GreenThumb and city maps showed them as vacant spaces. The R.F.Q. to sell lots to developers for $1 was not made publicly and gardeners found out about the initiative through 596 Acres, a non-profit that maps open city land and advocates for community uses. In January 2016, 36 of the gardens were conveyed into the Parks Department to remain gardens.

In November 2025, the Adams administration, while transitioning out of office after Mayor-elect Zohran Mamdani won the 2025 mayoral election, designated Elizabeth Street Garden as a city park, making it impossible to build on the site without state approval. Mamdani criticized the decision from an affordable housing perspective. Mayor Adams had initially approved an affordable housing project on the garden’s site but pulled back in June.

== Community gardens as community space ==
Electric Ladybug Garden in Central Harlem, a community garden supported by NYC Parks and GreenThumb NYC, fall 2026

Community gardens provide neighborhoods with communal space that is often lacking in New York City and becomes rarer as gentrification, displacement, and development spread throughout the city. Community gardens provide spaces of agricultural production, community, and ethnic expression. Within New York City, there is a range of types of community gardens from those that designate plots, which results in a "patchwork of private property" to those that communally manage the growing operation and decision making.

== Research on social-ecological value ==
A study of 35 community gardens in East Harlem found gardeners to have deep place-attachment to their gardens, with the community gardens also contributing to a general sense of neighborhood pride. A case study of several New York City community gardens after Hurricane Sandy indicated that they served as a community of practice helping to support each other before and after the storm. New York City community gardens have also been shown to reduce storm water runoff due to pervious surfaces as well as raised beds and compost soil amendments. Finally, community gardens in the Bronx and East Harlem were found to harbor over 50 bee species, providing pollination for locally grown crops.

== Gardening programs ==
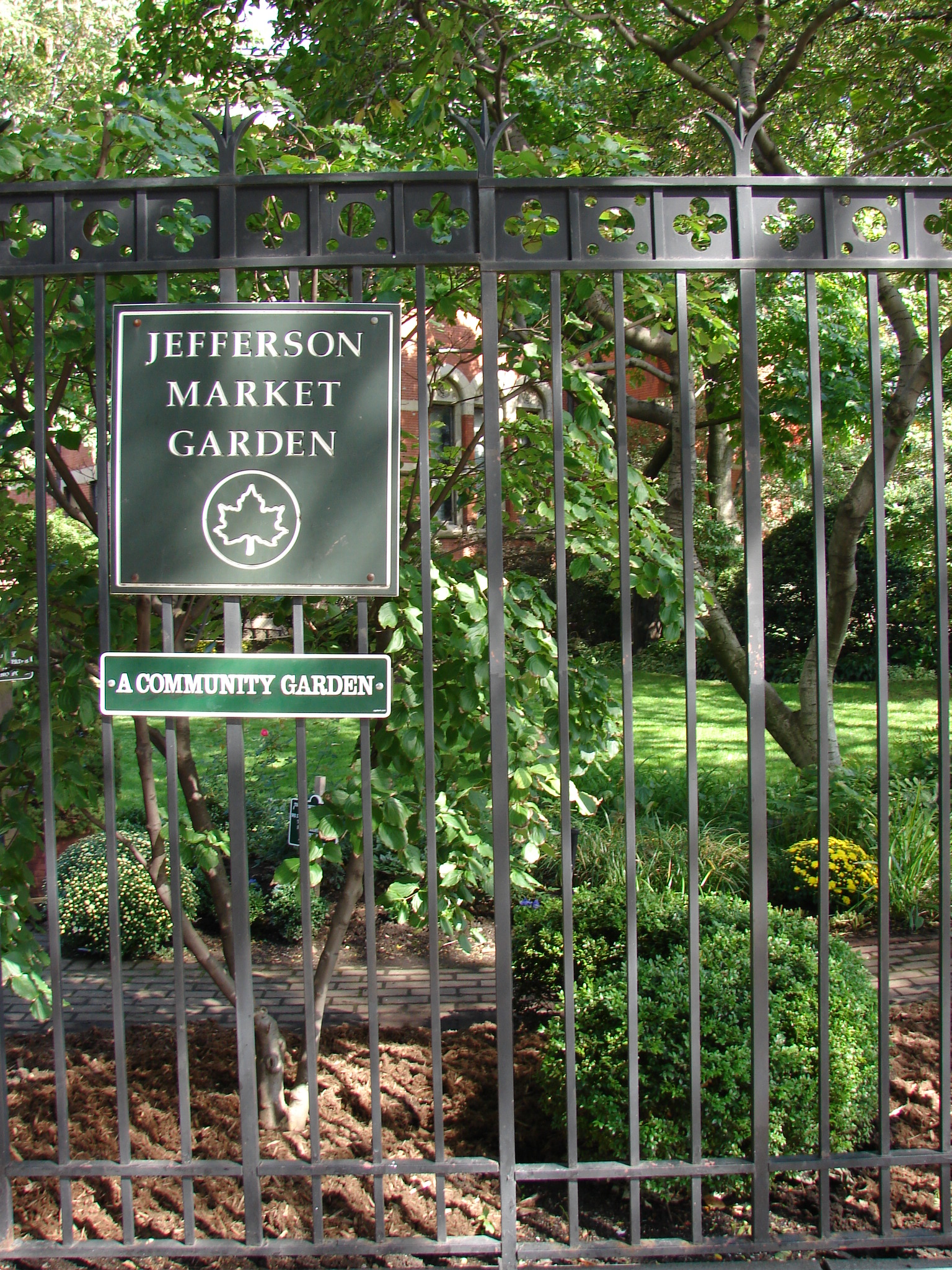
Jefferson Market Garden, West Village

=== GreenThumb ===
GreenThumb is the program administered by the NYC Department of Parks and Recreation, which provides resources and coordinates leases for city-owned vacant land. Originally called "Operation GreenThumb," it was formed in 1978 and was originally sponsored by the City Department of General Services. In 1984, 10-year leases for gardens were introduced. In 1988, GreenThumb expanded their work to provide support for school gardens and, in 2010, founded the Grow to Learn program in partnership with GrowNYC and the Mayor's Fund, which includes over 745 school gardens.

Today, GreenThumb is the largest urban gardening program in the United States, supporting over 550 gardens and 20,000 garden members throughout the city. Most of its community gardens are a single lot but they add up to over 100 acres of public open space. GreenThumb provides resources including soil, lumber, supplies, plant materials, and compost. Every year since 1984, GreenThumb has held the GrowTogether Conference for gardeners around the city.

To be in good standing with GreenThumb, garden groups must register every four years, sign the license agreement, provide keys to the gate, and submit the garden's bylaws. The license agreement includes posting signage, maintaining open hours, active membership, and the garden space; hosting public events; and assuming risk. Chickens, bees, rabbits, and fish may all be kept in gardens.

=== Land trusts ===
==== New York Restoration Project ====
New York Restoration Project (NYRP) was founded in 1995 by Bette Midler when the organization transformed a vacant lot into Highbridge Park in Upper Manhattan. In 1999, NYRP raised $1.2 million to purchase 50 gardens that would have otherwise been auctioned off by the Giuliani administration. NYRP currently owns and manages 52 community gardens throughout the city.

In 2007, NYRP worked with the Bloomberg administration to form MillionTreesNYC, whose goal was to plant a million trees in the five boroughs by 2017.

===== The Trust for Public Land =====
In 1999, through negotiations with the City of New York, The Trust for Public Land (TPL) diverted 113 New York gardens from public auction. The TPL purchased 63 gardens for $3 million.

===== Brooklyn Queens Land Trust =====
In 2004, the Brooklyn Queens Land Trust (BQLT) was incorporated to manage community gardens in the City of New York. The BQLT currently owns 35 community gardens in Brooklyn and Queens.

=== New York City Housing Authority ===
New York City Housing Authority (NYCHA) is New York City's largest property owner and provides support for over 700 gardens throughout its 328 public housing developments. Since 1963, NYCHA has hosted its annual Garden and Greening Awards Competition for residents. It was inspired by flower gardens at Chicago's public housing developments. The Housing Authority board felt that a competition would encourage pride in their homes and a sense of community among tenants. Award winners are selected in every borough and citywide in categories including Best Flower Garden, Best Vegetable Garden and Best Children's Theme Garden.

In addition to its gardens, NYCHA has six farms on its properties. Farms are constructed and operated by 18-24 year-old residents who are Green City Force (GCF) AmeriCorps Members.

== Former community gardens in New York ==
Many community gardens in New York are bulldozed to make way for new construction. This new construction commonly leads to gentrification. These gardens include (but are not limited to):

- Esperanza Garden, 2000
- Garden of Eden, 1986
- Chico Mendez Mural Garden, 1997
