= GrowNYC =

Environmental organisation in New York City, USA

- Founded: 1970
- Founder: Marian Sulzberger Heiskell
- Purpose: Food Accessibility and Conservation
- Location: New York, NY, United States
- Region served: New York City
- Website: https://www.grownyc.org/about
- Formerly called: Council on the Environment of New York City (CENYC)

GrowNYC is an environmental organization founded in 1970 and based in New York City, originally named the Council on the Environment of New York City (CENYC). GrowNYC is dedicated to the improvement New York City's quality of life through environmental programs, including Farmers' markets, community recycling, gardening, and environmental education.

== Food Access Programs ==
=== Fresh Food Boxes ===
GrowNYC offers fresh food boxes that New Yorkers can pick up to support local farmers and city food access programs. In order to promote access for all, patrons can pay for food boxes using SNAP/EBT benefits, and are generally offered at $1/pound for seasonal produce.

=== Green Markets and Farmstands ===
Throughout the city, GrowNYC has food markets that operate on different days, such as the market in Union Square that operates on Monday, Wednesday, Friday and Saturday. These stands allow local farmers and food makers to sell their goods. New Yorkers can use SNAP/EBT benefits at these markets, and can find markets near them using GrowNYC's locator tool.

In May 2023, Green Market workers gained the right to sit in their work contracts.

=== Education ===
GrowNYC's education outreach program helps New York citizens learn about recycling, food access, urban gardening, composting, and conservation. Students may take field trips to Green Markets, establish and maintain a school garden, or visit the Teaching Garden on Governor's Island to work on a real urban farm. Interested students can volunteer to help other students learn about these initiatives. GrowNYC Education also partners with the NYC Department of Sanitation to educate citizens about curbside composting and enforce program rules.

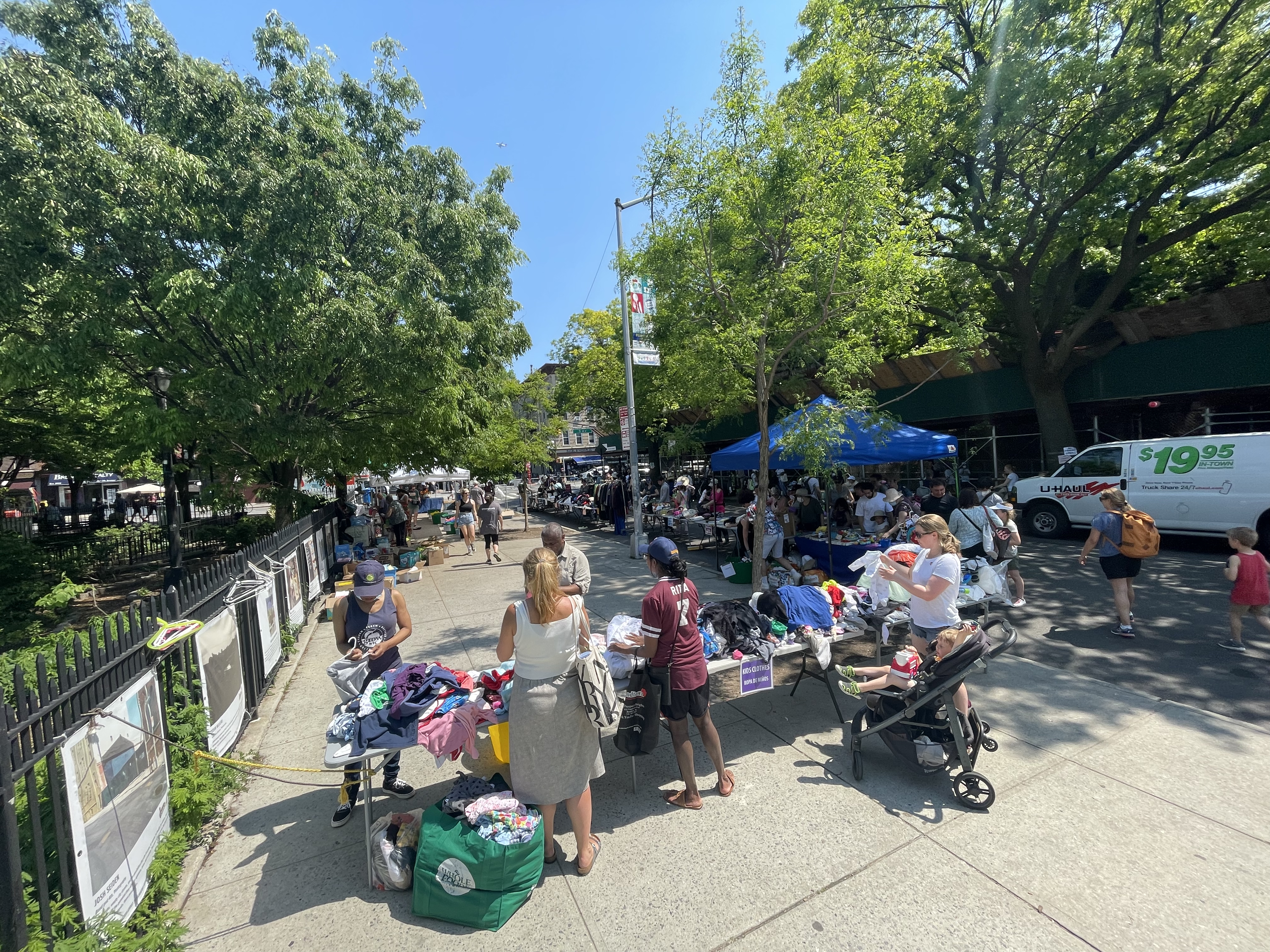
People search through a reuse free item give-away at the GrowNYC Greenmarket on the street next to Washington Park in Brooklyn
