= Rutgers Houses =

Public housing development in Manhattan, New York

- NYCHA property
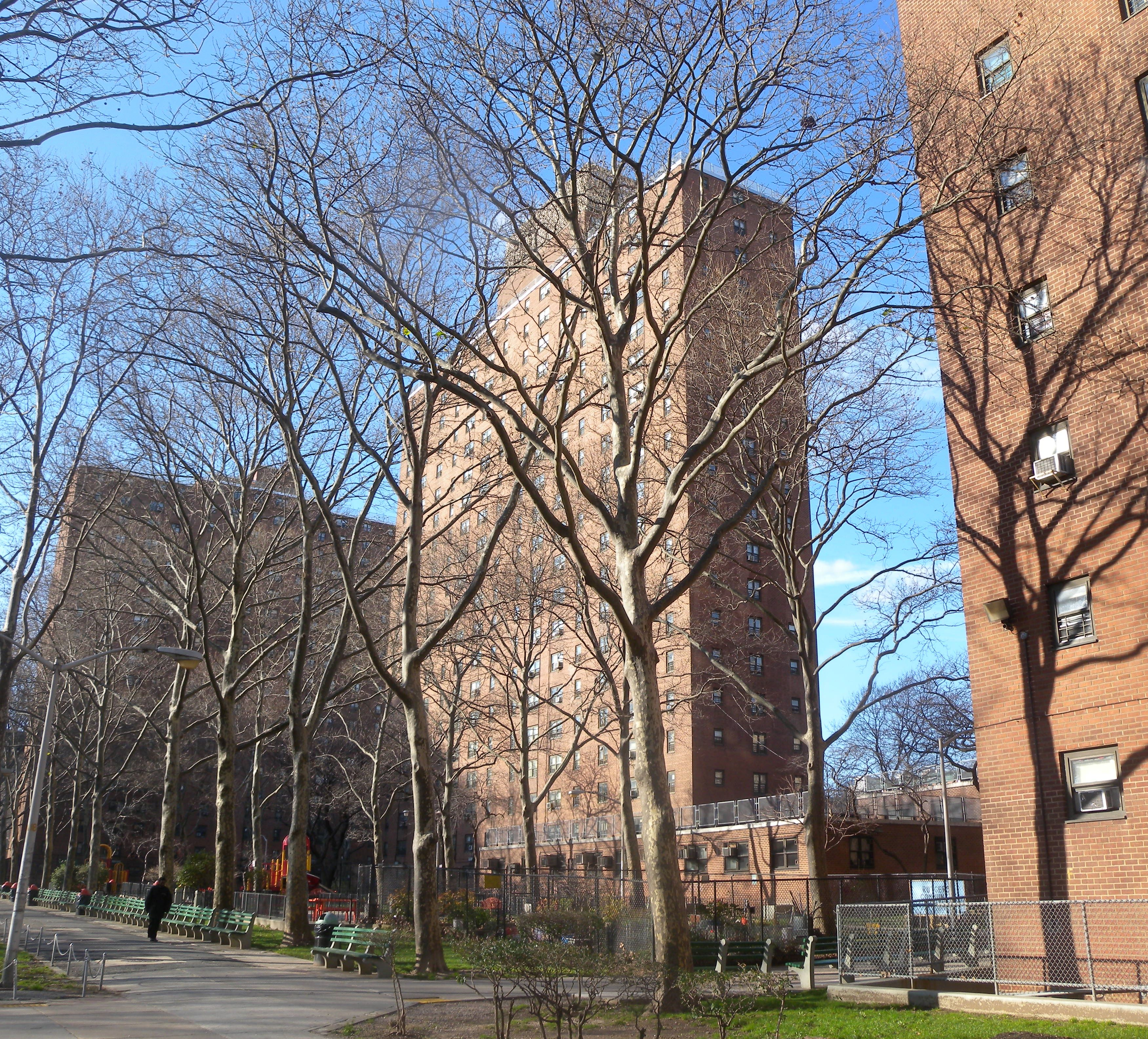
- Rutgers Houses in 2011
- Location in New York City
- Coordinates: 40.711852°N 73.991001°W
- Country: United States
- State: New York
- City: New York City
- Borough: Manhattan

Area
  - Total: 0.008 sq mi (0.021 km^{2})

Population
  - Total: 1,575
  - Density: 200,000/sq mi (76,000/km^{2})
- ZIP codes: 10002
- Area codes: 212, 332, 646, and 917
- Website: my.nycha.info/DevPortal/

The Rutgers Houses (Henry Rutgers Houses) are a set of public residential high-rises built and maintained by the New York City Housing Authority (NYCHA). It is located in Manhattan in the center of the Two Bridges neighborhood (west of the southwest border of the Lower East Side). The Rutgers Houses are composed of five 20-story buildings on 5.22 acres (21,100 m^{2}) with 721 apartments housing approximately 1,675 people. The complex is bordered by Madison Street to the north, Rutgers Street to the east, Cherry Street to the south, and Pike Street to the west.

== Development ==
Prior to its completion in 1965, the Rutgers Houses was one of the sites of city-wide civil rights protests in 1963. Demonstrators attempted to block construction until African Americans and Latinos get more jobs in the building trades until several were taken into custody. While not in opposition to the protests, construction crews at the development site were reported to have said they were more integrated than most.

Designed by Hart, Jerman & Associates, the Rutgers Houses in 1961, the development was completed March 31, 1965. Pelham Street, which ran between Pike Street and Rutgers Street, was taken off maps of the area about 1960 for the construction of the development. The development is named after Henry Rutgers (1745–1830), a captain in the American Revolutionary War and a major landowner and philanthropist who was the last descendant of Dutch immigrants. Henry Rutgers' farm, the "Bouwery", made up most of the Lower East Side around Chinatown, and later gave large sections of his farm to churches and the development is on a part of the former farm site.

Michael Steele is serving as the Resident Association President for Rutgers Houses and as the Treasurer of the Manhattan South District Citywide Council of Presidents.

In the winter of 2007, Rutgers House V served as a "warming center", a warm place where people without heat can stay for short periods of time. In 2010, the Rutgers Houses were one of eight developments to receive a portion of $400 million in funding from the federal government to address capitol needs for repairs.

== Notable residents ==
- Elisa Izquierdo (1989 – 1995), Elisa's death was the inspiration for Elisa's Law, a major restructuring of the New York City Child Welfare System

== Nearby public residential high-rises ==
- LaGuardia Houses
- Vladeck Houses
- Alfred E. Smith Houses

== See also ==
- New York City Housing Authority
- List of New York City Housing Authority properties
