= 51 Market Street =

Historic house in Manhattan, New York

- U.S. National Register of Historic Places
- U.S. Historic district – Contributing property
- New York State Register of Historic Places
- New York City Landmark
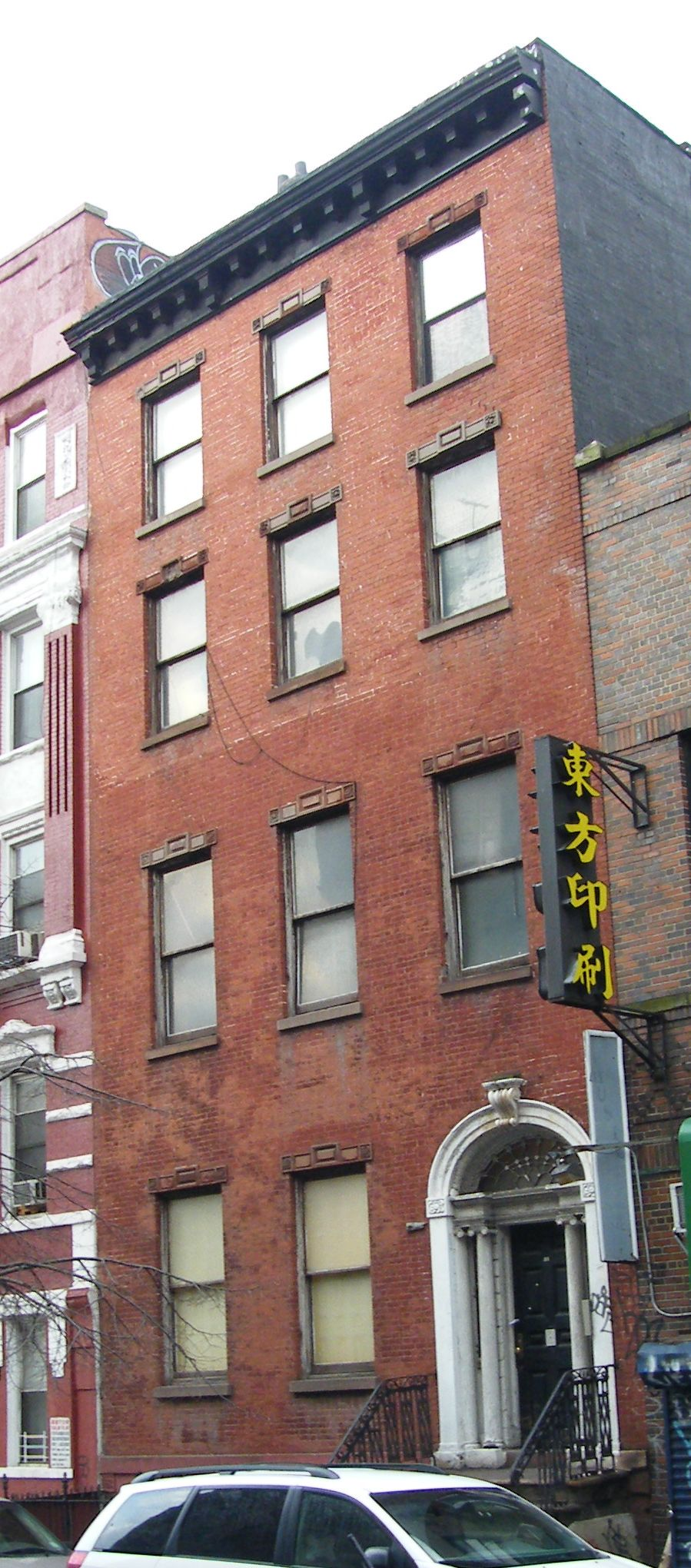
- (2009)

- Location within Lower Manhattan Location within New York Location within the United States
- Location: 51 Market Street; Manhattan, New York City
- Coordinates: 40°42′42″N 73°59′42″W
- Built: 1824–25
- Architectural style: Federal
- Part of: Two Bridges Historic District (ID03000845)
- NRHP reference No.: 77000959
- NYSRHP No.: 06101.000147
- NYCL No.: 0008

Significant dates
- Added to NRHP: July 29, 1977
- Designated CP: August 29, 2003
- Designated NYSRHP: June 23, 1980
- Designated NYCL: October 14, 1965

51 Market Street, also known as the William and Rosamond Clark House, is a historic house located between Madison and Monroe Streets in lower Manhattan in New York City. The two-story gambrelled house was built in 1824–25 in the late Federal style at a time when the Lower East Side was an affluent residential neighborhood. The original owner was apparently William Clark, a grocer. The upper two stories were added late in the 19th century. The house has been described in the AIA Guide to New York City as a "superb" example of the Federal style.

51 Market Street was designated a New York City landmark in 1965, and was added to the National Register of Historic Places in 1977.

== See also ==
- National Register of Historic Places listings in Manhattan below 14th Street
- List of New York City Designated Landmarks in Manhattan below 14th Street
