= Allen Street =

Street in Manhattan, New York

- Pike Street (south of Division Street)
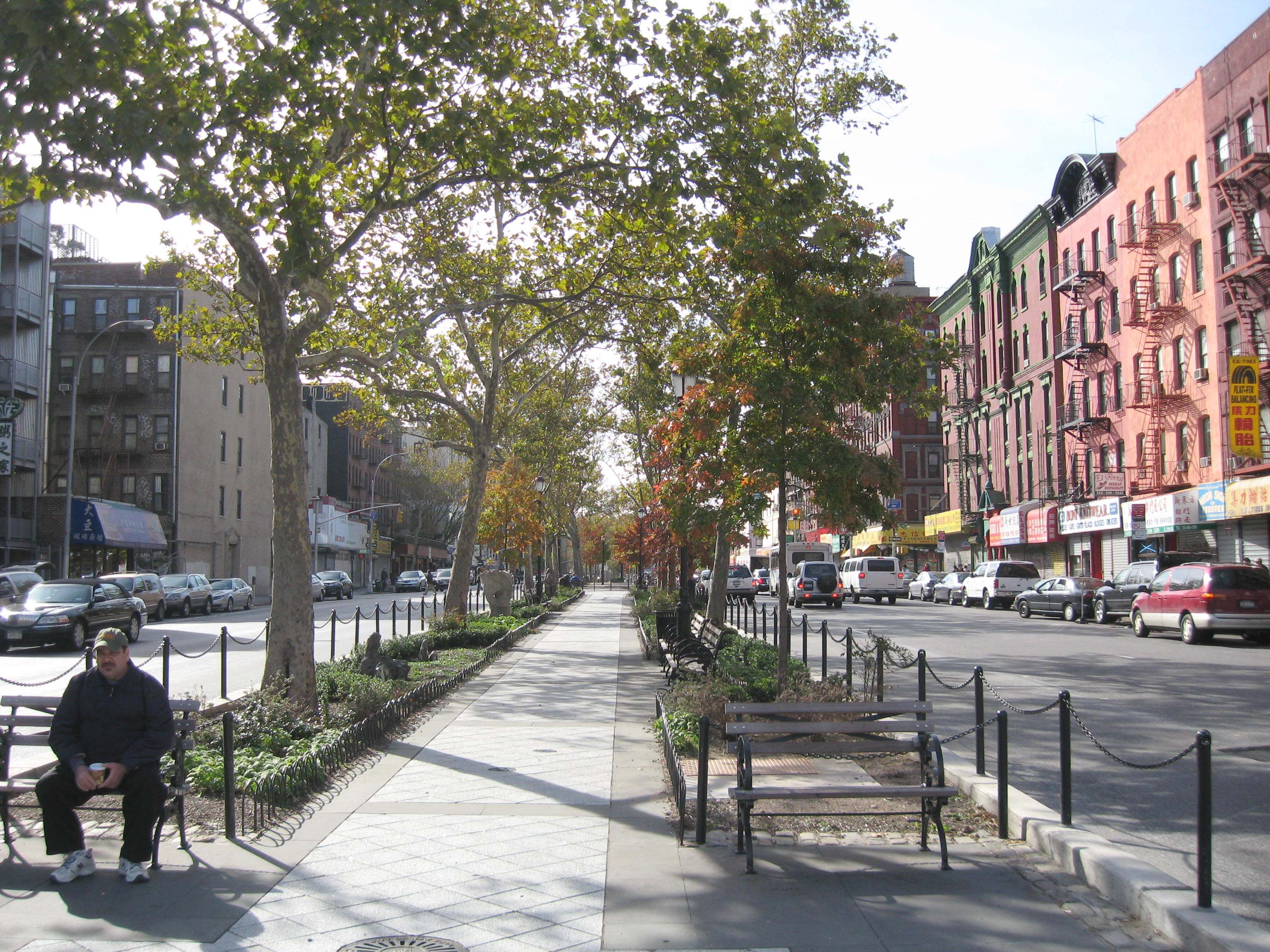
- Allen Street's median mall, since rebuilt
- Interactive map of Allen Street
- Former name: Chester Street
- Location: Manhattan, New York City
- Postal code: 10002
- Coordinates: 40°43′06″N 73°59′26″W
- North end: Houston Street
- South end: South Street
- North: First Avenue
- East: Orchard Street
- West: Eldridge Street

Allen Street is a street in the New York City borough of Manhattan which runs north-south through the Lower Manhattan neighborhood of Chinatown and the Lower East Side. It is continued north of Houston Street as First Avenue. South of Division Street, it is known as Pike Street to its southern terminus at South Street. The northbound and southbound roadways are separated by a meridian mall, which has two bike lanes located outside the meridian mall. Each bike lane is unidirectional. The street's namesake was Master Commandant William Henry Allen, the youngest person to command a Navy ship in the War of 1812. He was killed in action at the age of 28. His exploits included the capture of the British ship HMS Macedonian.

== History ==
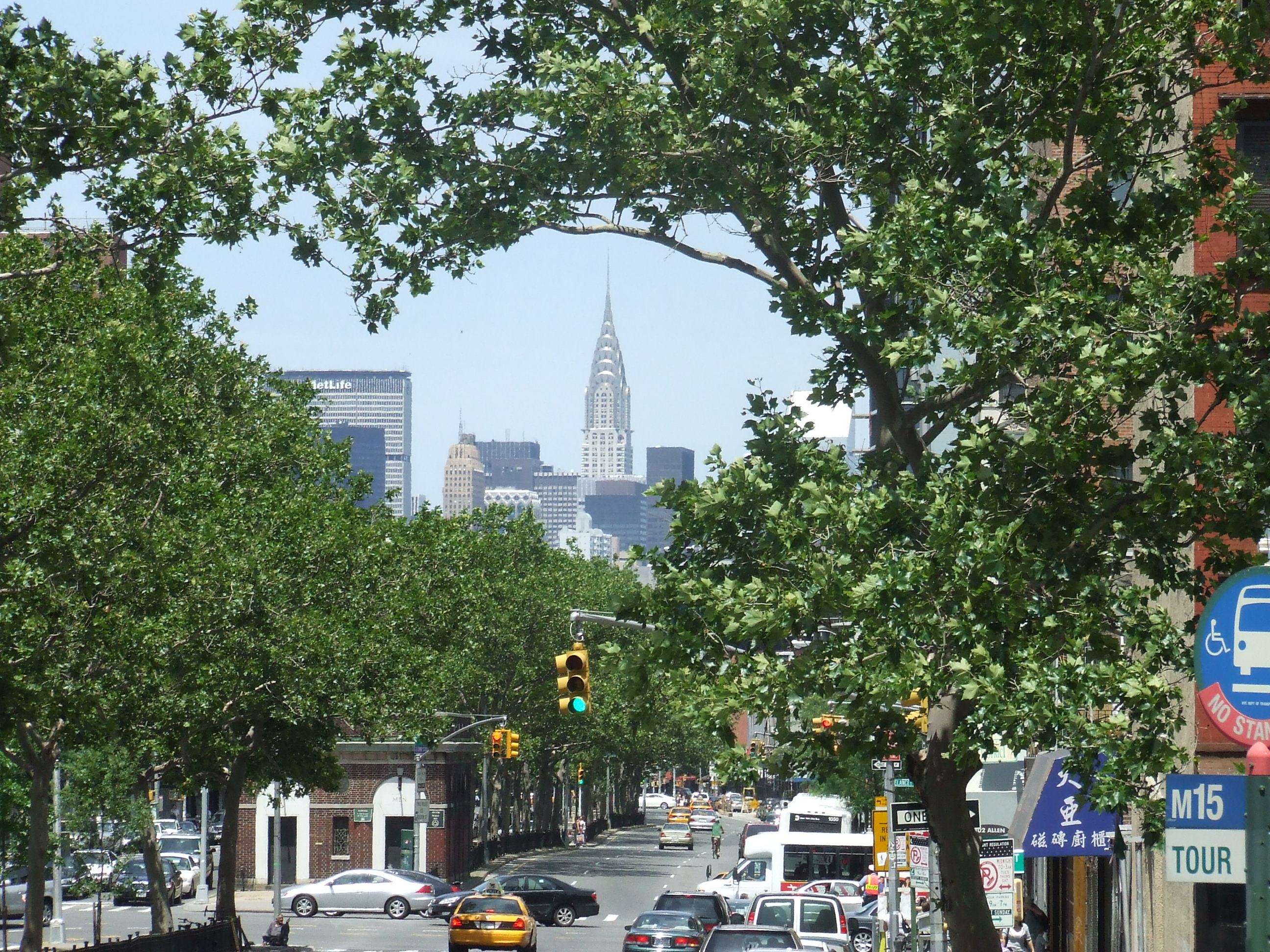
Looking north from Broome Street.

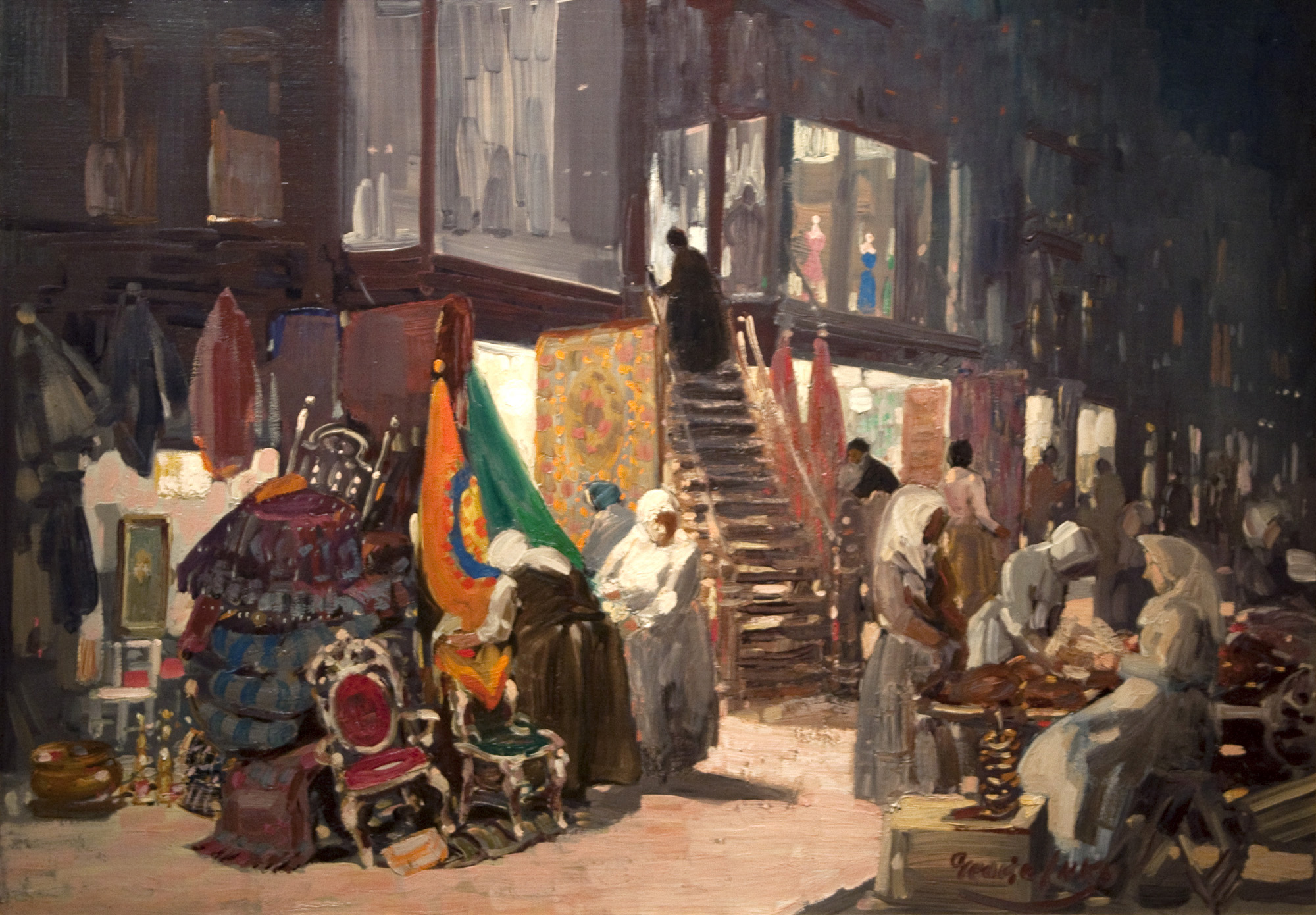
George B. Luks, Allen Street, c.1905

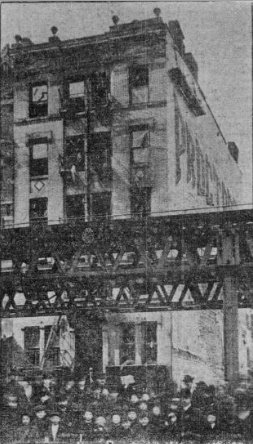
105 Allen Street after the 1905 fire, with the Second Avenue El in the foreground

Prior to 1799, this street in lower Manhattan was laid out and named "Chester Street". After the building of the New York Orphan Asylum on this street around May 1806 "Chester Street" was renamed "Asylum Street". In 1833, "Asylum Street" was quietly renamed Third Street, and finally "Allen Street."

During its heyday in the early part of the 20th century, it was populated by Romanian Jews, as well as Sephardic Jews from Turkey, Syria, Egypt and Greece. Many worked in brass and copper fabrication shops in the basements, while the wares were sold in street level stores. In September 1903, a gun battle was fought beneath the El tracks at Allen and Rivington Streets between followers of Paul Kelly, leader of the Five Points Gang, and the rival gang of Monk Eastman. At one point a hundred men joined the fray, with police driven off by gunfire. Three men were killed and numerous innocent civilians were injured.

Fire destroyed an overcrowded tenement on Allen Street in March 1905, claiming the lives of twenty people. The five-story building at 105 Allen Street housed 200 people.

The street was widened in the early 1930s by demolition of buildings on the east side of the street. This created a broad thoroughfare with a median mall in the center and the El running down the western roadway. The El was demolished in 1942.

Allen Street was the site of numerous shops specializing in brassware in the 1910s through the 1940s but only two such shops remained by the late 1970s. In 1979, Allen Street was described by New York magazine as an "unbusy area removed from the bustle of Grand Street and the Bowery."

The street's center mall, along with that of Pike Street, was reconfigured in 2009. Parts of that mall were reconstructed completely in 2011.

== Transportation ==
A portion of the elevated IRT Second Avenue Line, commonly known as the Second Avenue El, was constructed over Allen Street's current southbound roadway (then the entire street) from Houston Street to Division Street in 1878, blocking out most of the light from the then-narrow street. The elevated railway was taken down in 1942. Currently, the nearest subway stations are Grand Street station, three blocks west at Chrystie Street (B and D trains) and Delancey Street – Essex Street station, three blocks east at Essex Street (F, <F>, J, M, and Z trains). Also, at the corner of East Houston Street and Allen Street, there are multiple entrances to the Second Avenue station (F and <F> trains). There is also an intercity bus station at 84-86 Allen Street.

Allen Street in its entirety and Pike Street north of Madison Street is served by the M15/M15 SBS bus routes. Some local buses also serve Pike Street in its entirety, and some southbound SBS service short-turns at Houston Street. Additional service is provided by the westbound M22 running non-stop north from Madison Street to East Broadway, and the B39 at Delancey Street, using Rivington Street out of service to change direction.
