= East Broadway (Manhattan) =

Street in Manhattan, New York

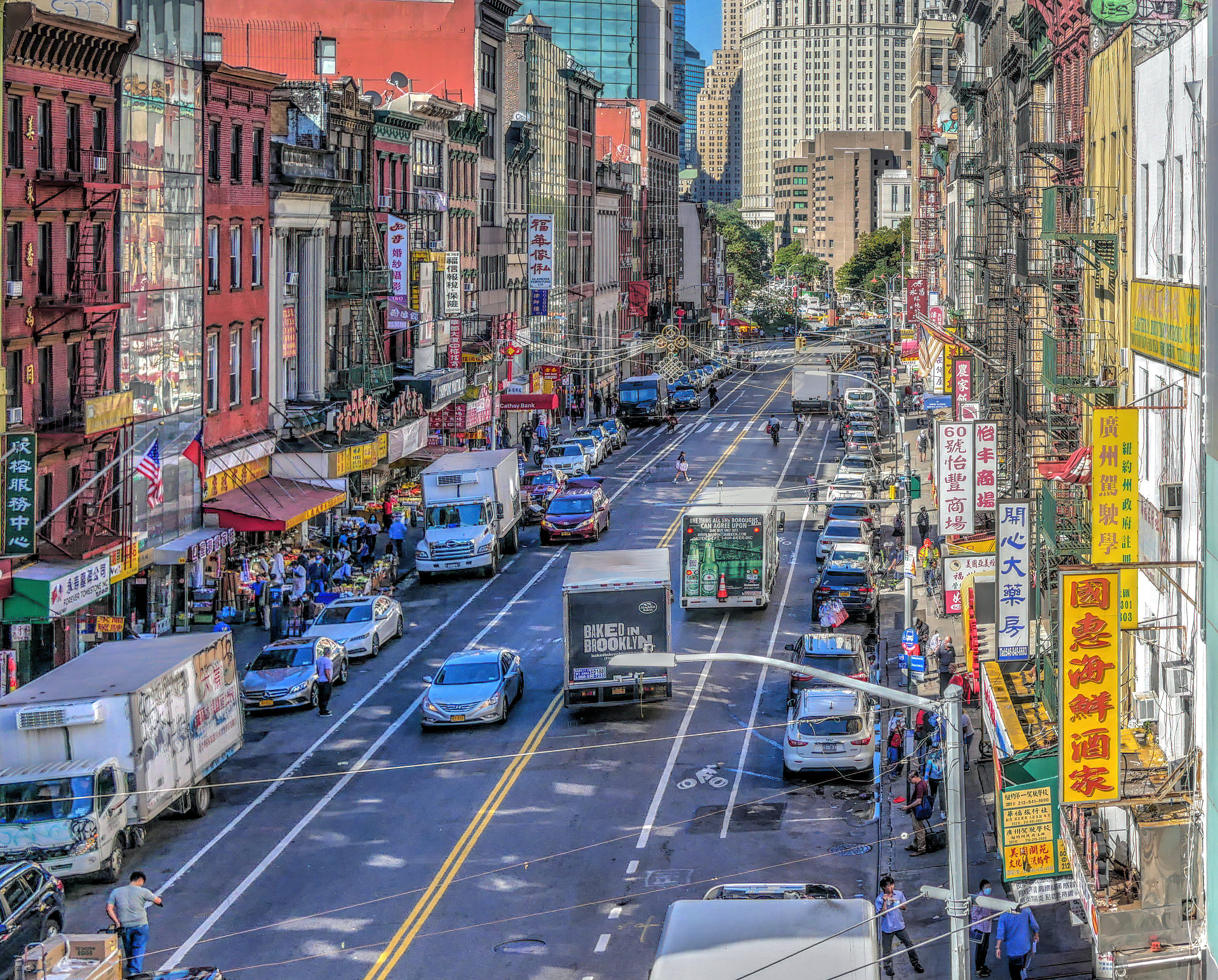
Little Fuzhou on East Broadway is seen from the Manhattan Bridge.

East Broadway is a two-way east–west street in the Chinatown, Two Bridges, and Lower East Side neighborhoods of the New York City borough of Manhattan in the U.S. state of New York.

East Broadway begins at Chatham Square (also known as Kimlau Square) and runs eastward under the Manhattan Bridge, continues past Seward Park and the eastern end of Canal Street, and ends at Grand Street.

The western portion of the street has evolved into the neighborhood known as Little Fuzhou, or Manhattan's Fuzhou Town (福州埠, 紐約華埠), primarily populated by Chinese immigrants (mainly Foochowese who emigrated from Fuzhou, Fujian), while the eastern portion was traditionally home to a large number of Jews. One section in the eastern part of East Broadway, between Clinton Street and Pitt Street, has been unofficially referred to by residents as "Shteibel Way", since it has been lined with up to ten small synagogues ("shteibels") in its history.

== Ethnic groups ==
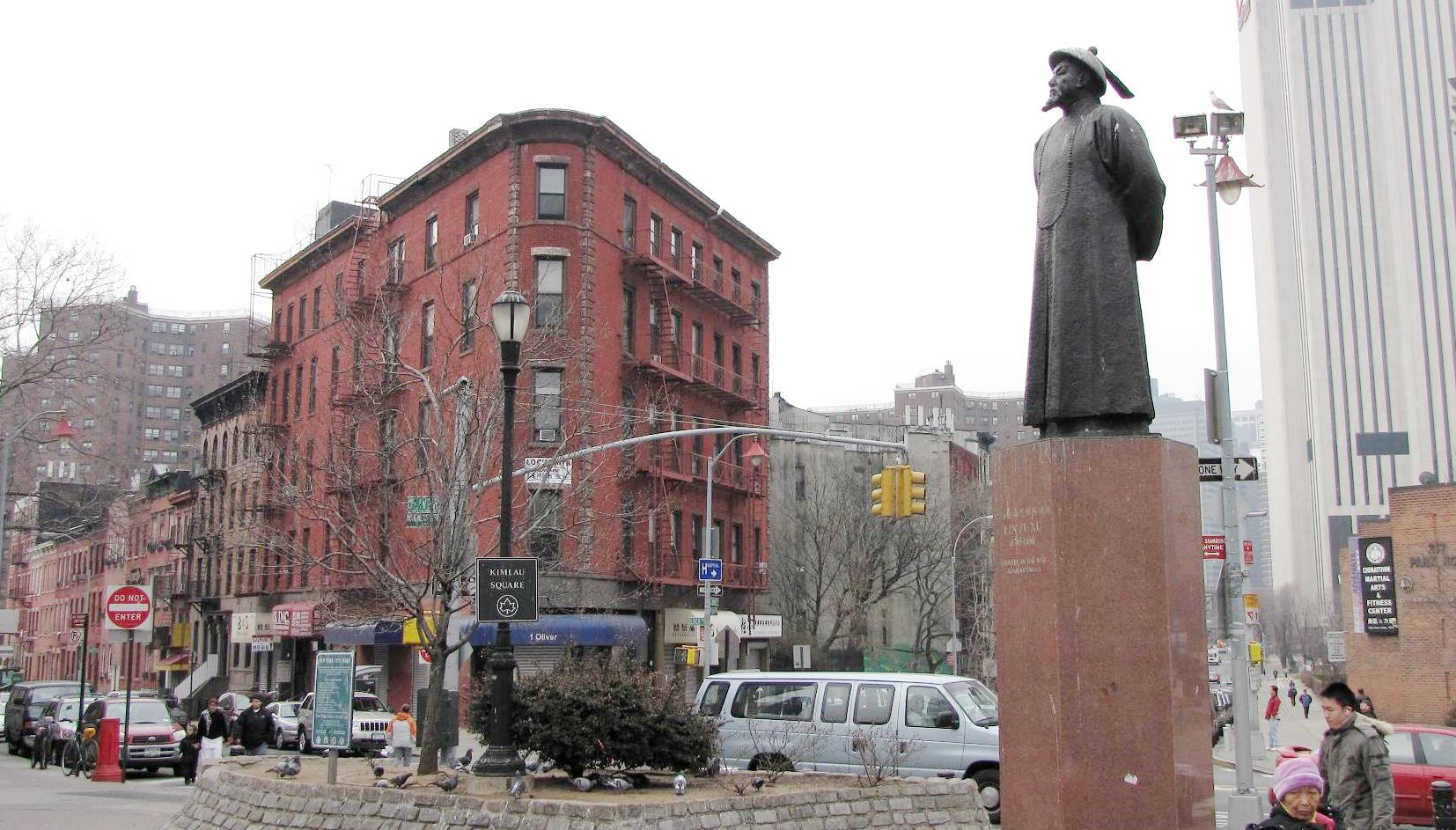
Chatham Square and Lin Zexu Statue

=== Earlier Ethnic Populations ===
East Broadway was home to a large Jewish community on the Lower East Side and then later on Puerto Ricans began to settle onto this street and African Americans were also residing on this street.

During the 1960s, an influx of Hong Kong immigrants were arriving over along with Taiwanese immigrants as well into Manhattan's Chinatown. Subsequently, Cantonese people and businesses also began to settle onto this street, as Manhattan's Chinatown was expanding into other parts of the Lower East Side, and Manhattan's Chinatown Chinese population was vastly Cantonese-dominated at the time. During this time period, Manhattan's Chinatown was being referred as a growing Little Hong Kong. Vietnamese people also began to settle on this street as well.

During this time, East Broadway had not evolved into a Little Fuzhou enclave yet, however small numbers of Fuzhou immigrants have existed around the area of Division Street and East Broadway as early as the 1970s and early 1980s, including the Fujianese gang named the Fuk Ching. Although the Chinese population have been increasing in this portion of the Lower East Side since the 1960s, however until the 1980s, the western portion of Manhattan's Chinatown was the most fully Chinese populated and developed and flourishing as a busy Chinese business district, while East Broadway along with the eastern portion of Chinatown east of the Bowery was developing more slowly as being part of Chinatown. The eastern portion of Manhattan's Chinatown had lower and scattered numbers of Chinese residents and higher numbers of Non-Chinese residents mainly Latinos and Jewish than Manhattan's Chinatown's western portion.

During the 1970s and 1980s, East Broadway was one of the many streets east of the Bowery heading deeper onto the Lower East Side that many people were afraid to walk through or even reside in due to poor building structures and high crime rates such as gang related activities, robberies, building burglaries, and rape, as well as rising racial tensions with other ethnic enclaves residing in the area. In addition, businesses were often very few and significant numbers of unoccupied properties. Chinese female garment workers heading home were often high targets of mugging and rape and many of them leaving work to go home often left together as a group for safety reasons.

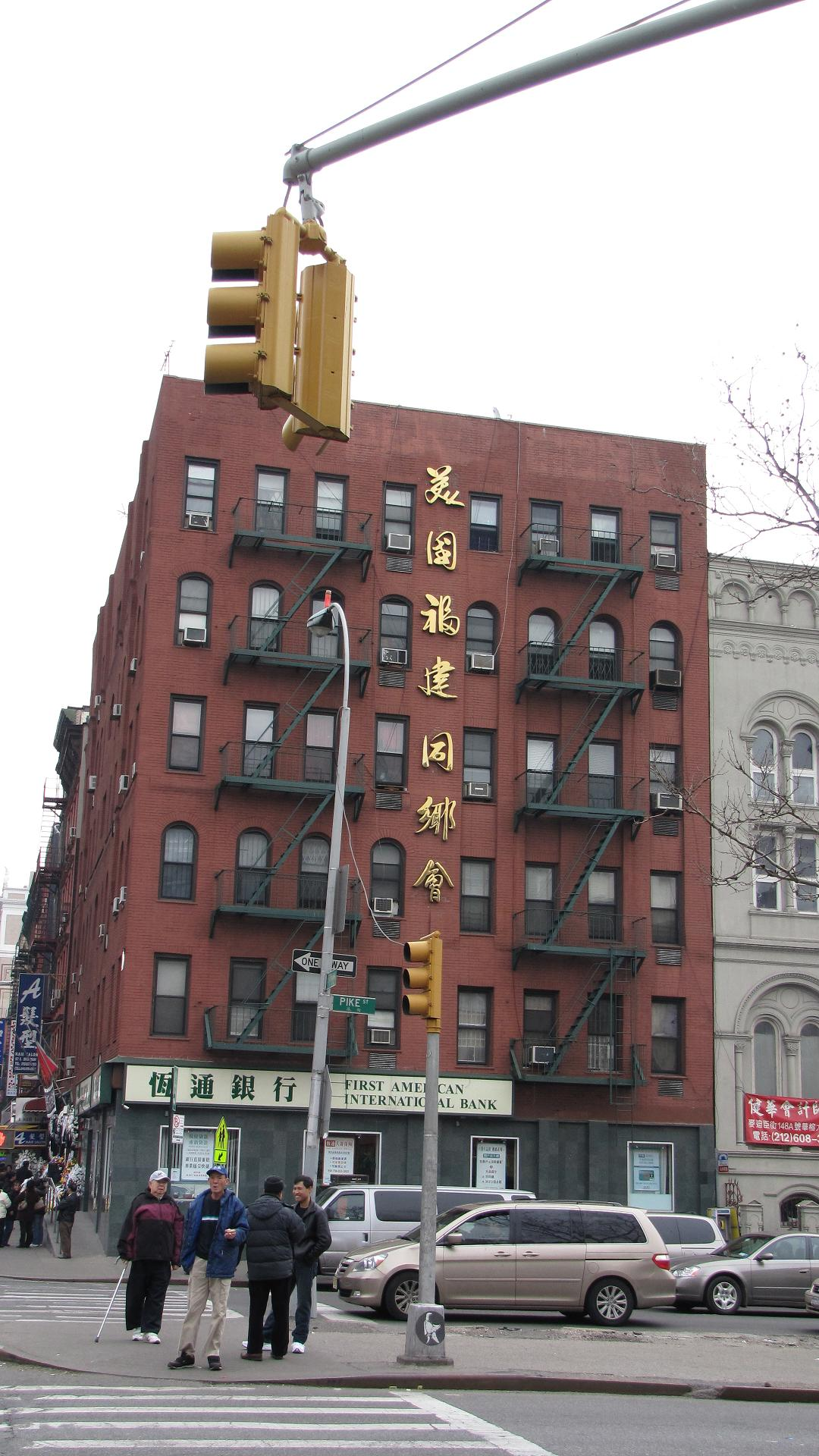
Fukien American Association at East Broadway

=== Little Fuzhou ===
It was during the 1980s and 1990s that East Broadway emerged as a distinctly identifiable neighborhood within Chinatown itself, populated by immigrants from Fuzhou, many of them undocumented. During the 1990s and 2000s, it was the primary cultural center for Fuzhou immigrants in NYC, but since the mid to late 2000s, rapid gentrification has caused the Fuzhou residents and businesses to relocate to other parts of New York City.

A substantial number of Fuzhou immigrants have been displaced due to rising rents in the neighborhood. The 2010 U.S. census found that about 6,000 Chinese residents of Chinatown (about 17% of the neighborhood's Chinese residents) were displaced from the neighborhood in the preceding decade. In 2014, Sing Tao Daily reported that "the population of new immigrants, especially those from Fujian province, is much smaller compared to 10 years ago." A July 2018 report noted that Fujianese-owned businesses have been declining on East Broadway due to high rents, leading to empty storefronts. In addition, Fujianese who used to commute to Manhattan instead began traveling to Flushing's Chinatown in Queens and Sunset Park's Chinatown in Brooklyn.

== Structures and places ==
=== Chinese movie theaters of the past ===
In the past, East Broadway was very well known to the Chinese population for having two Chinese theaters, as several other Chinese theaters were located in different parts of Chinatown. However, all of the Chinese movie theaters have closed in Chinatown.

==== Sun Sing Theater ====
In 1911, the Florence theater with 980 seats opened under the Manhattan Bridge on 75–85 East Broadway showing Yiddish entertainment. Next to the theater, there was also a furniture shop named Solerwitz & Law, est. 1886.

It was then converted as the New Canton Theater in 1942. It featured Cantonese operas and other types of performances such as "Selling Rough", "Beauty on the Palm", and "The Beautiful Butterflies" to name on record. The performances often featured 1,400-year-old Chinese tradition usually based on folklore. Cantonese opera was very often looked down on by westerners as sounding annoying, inhuman and distasteful.

A professional Cantonese opera troupe, Tai Wah Wing came from Hong Kong to New York in 1940 to perform and changed their name to Nau Joek Sen Zung Wa Ban Nam Ney Keik Tin (New York New China Mixed Opera Company) once arriving in New York. Being that they were stranded in New York by World War II with 20 male and 7 female actors along with six musicians, they kept the New Canton Theater active and going for 10 years with their nightly performances of classical Cantonese opera on Mondays-Saturdays from 7 pm-11:30 pm and on Sundays from 6 pm-10:30 pm. At one time in 1941 Claude Lévi-Strauss witnessed their performance while he was in New York serving as a cultural adviser for the French Embassy. When the theater was renamed as Sun Sing theater in 1950, during that same time they once again changed their troupe name to Nam Ney Keik Tin (Mixed Opera Company). Once they discontinued during May 1950, the over-half-century-long tradition of Cantonese opera performances ended in the Chinatown neighborhood and then the Sun Sing theater during the same year began to feature Chinese films with English subtitles included sometimes.

It was in danger of being torn down because of an additional deck being added onto the Manhattan Bridge, but it was saved when city engineers used bridge supports and seats had to be eliminated for the bridge supports. In 1972, the theater started to provide diverse entertainments of film and stage performances. Like many movie theaters, the theater also sold snacks with also Chinese snacks such as preserved plum, dried cuttlefish, and shrimp chips.

During the last 15 years of the theater's existence under the Manhattan Bridge with the B, D, and Q trains rumbling loudly above on the north side of the bridge, it featured wild films involving battles and violence. During its final years with 800 seats, the theater began doing outreach to attract more non-Chinese audiences by adding names of customers onto their mailing list while handing out hard copies of synopsis translated in English about each movie being shown at the moment to customers. It was finally closed in 1993 with Robert Tam being the final owner.

In 1996, Museum of Chinese in America located in the neighborhood collected remaining items from the already shuttered Sun Sing theater after a new tenant had signed a lease to use the commercial space and salvaged them for their historical collection for the museum. Sometime in the early 2000s or so, a mini mall opened up with many various Chinese shops at this location just across the street from another mini mall called the East Broadway Mall that had opened about a decade earlier sometime in the late 1980s. However, since the 2010s especially with gentrification coming in, a large wave of the Chinese shops vacated this mini mall especially on the second floor of the mall, which has now entirely transformed into art gallery booths often hosting art cultural events with a music store with the owners and hosts being mainly non-Asian leaving the downstairs of the mini mall to still have remaining Chinese shops.

==== Pagoda Theater ====
In 1964, Lucas Liang who was a restaurateur and the president of the Catherine enterprises opened the Pagoda theater at 11 East Broadway on the corner of Catherine Street after eight months of construction and after many directors, mostly restaurant operators all together raised $400,000 to build the theater. Paul R. Screvane, president of the City Council at the time was invited as a guest of honor to the ceremony on the opening of the theater.

The seating capacities accommodated 492 seats. The theater featured Chinese films with English subtitles. On the weekend mornings, cartoons in English were shown to children. There was also a room facility where there was a coffee bar selling Chinese and American food products with a color television set.

There was one incident in 1977 where there was a shootout in the crowded theater killing two members of the Ghost Shadows Gang. Michael Chen, a leader of the Flying Dragons of the 70s in Manhattan's Chinatown was convicted and later acquitted for those charges of that incident and he was eventually murdered in 1982. At the time, gang violence was very prevalent in the Chinatown neighborhood including the rivalry of the Ghost Shadows and Flying Dragons.

The theater then closed around the late 1980s to early 1990s. After it was closed, there was one plan by a local builder to build a hotel in the location, but it was later realized that it would not work due to not having the financial resources.

In 1988, Glory China Development Ltd., of Hong Kong bought the property land and opened Glory China Tower in 1991. The bank was a tenant of Ka Wah Bank from Hong Kong owned by CITIC Group located in China. However, it was converted into a HSBC bank much later on.

=== East Broadway Mall ===
Under the Manhattan Bridge (B, D, N, and Q trains) lies the "East Broadway Mall" across the street from the previous location of Sun Sing Theater and upstairs of the mall housed the 88 Palace Restaurant serving Hong Kong style dim sum meals.

The property ground is actually city-owned and it was once a vacant lot. However, in 1985, the city signed a 50-year lease with a developer named Kwok Ming Chan building the East Broadway Mall and the official opening of the mall was in 1988. It initially first opened with storefronts being primarily Cantonese shops with many Cantonese customers as the Chinese population in the area was mainly Cantonese speaking at that time and the restaurant upstairs was originally named "Triple Eight Palace". However, East Broadway was already starting to experience a growing influx of Fuzhou immigrants as early as the 1980s and then into the 1990s, it slowly grew into a subdivided Fuzhou enclave separated from the traditional Cantonese Chinatown west of The Bowery, and then reflectively the Fuzhou owned storefronts slowly grew and over time completely occupying East Broadway Mall with the customer base shifting mainly to Fuzhou speakers. The mall was then inherited by Terry Chan, the son of Kwok Ming Chan.

During the 1990s and the 2000s, the mall became the center of contributing to the growth of Chinese restaurant businesses all over the United States as many employment agencies opened at this mall sending many of the Fuzhou workers to all-you-can-eat buffets with Chinese bus stations established around this mall to accommodate the Fuzhou restaurant workers to locations where they have been arranged by the employment agencies. However, in the past during the 2000s, there have been situations where there were accusations against the East Broadway Mall operators for mistreating their storefront tenants with illegally raising their rents and discrimination against the Fuzhou storefront owners, and trying to gentrify the mall. There were also accusations against the 88 Palace Restaurant managers for mistreating the Fuzhou workers by taking their tips, berating them, and giving them responsibilities that they were not supposed to be assigned to, which then led to lawsuits and the restaurant managers retaliated against them by threatening to terminate them since many of the Fuzhou workers lacked legal residency statuses.

However, starting in the 2000s, many Fuzhou immigrants from Manhattan's Chinatown began migrating into Brooklyn's Sunset Park Chinatown including the new Fuzhou arrivals in large numbers for better affordable housing conditions. Many also have been moving into Flushing's Chinatown though in lesser numbers than Sunset Park. However, as gentrification and spiking rent and property values accelerated in Manhattan's Chinatown starting in the 2000s and especially since the 2010s, the migration of the Fuzhou community escalated where Sunset Park's Chinatown quickly evolved into Brooklyn's Little Fuzhou and now the largest growing center of Fuzhou culture in the city while the Little Fuzhou in the eastern side of Manhattan's Chinatown has been continuously declining. Since then, many employment agencies vacated the neighborhood and moved to Brooklyn's Sunset Park. Many of the Fuzhou customers coming from other local parts of NYC and other outer states that used to travel to East Broadway by bus for commerce and errands have now almost completely shifted to traveling to Brooklyn's Little Fuzhou and secondarily to Flushing's Chinatown for these errand needs, which has resulted in now very few Fuzhou customers traveling by bus into the East Broadway area. Gentrification, spiking property values and rent prices in the area along with the continuous declination of the Fuzhou consumers have also accelerated increasing numbers of vacant storefronts in the neighborhood and the East Broadway Mall was not immune to such situations with now very few customers and also massive numbers of vacant storefronts where it was eventually compared to a ghost town. By 2018 there was an art gallery occupying a storefront space.

However, the COVID-19 pandemic in New York City much further accelerated the trend of the vacancies at this mall worsening the economic situation and now even much fewer customers are frequenting this small shopping center. In addition, the upstairs restaurant 88 Palace also permanently closed and has been left vacant since then. Criticisms by Councilwoman Margaret Chin have been made against the operators of East Broadway Mall about the poor management and poor maintenance of the mall as well as substandard treatments against storefront tenants along with being behind in rent payments to the city. On October 25, 2021, WABC-TV reported that East Broadway Mall was in danger of closing due to increasing rents and property values, which were exacerbated during the pandemic when tenants left. The owner said there were 80 storefront tenants before the pandemic, later reduced to roughly 17. There were reports that the city planned to lease East Broadway Mall to a new management group. In November 2021, the media reported that the New York State Government provided $20 million in grant money to revitalize a few city-owned grounds in the Two Bridges section such as Chatham Square/KimLau Square, Forsyth Plaza just at the ground level of Manhattan Bridge and including the East Broadway Mall. There are proposals to restructure the East Broadway Mall into a community theater indoors and retail outdoors. In an October 2022 article from Curbed, it was reported the government grant was being rescinded from East Broadway Mall due to some legal situations between the mall and the city who rents the space to Terry Chan to operate East Broadway Mall. Terry Chan has commented he may decide to rent his empty storefront spaces to Non-Asians just like the mini mall across the street has started doing in order to maintain tenants and increase revenue, which is an indication that this mall could possibly begin to gentrify and become more culturally mixed in the future. Although the upstairs dim sum restaurant has shuttered, from time to time, the space gets rented to young hipster party organizers that host parties there. Some 2023 reports have indicated a new operation company called, Broadway East Group LLC is going to be taking over this shopping center and revitalizing it with $5 million to be invested to do the renovations. Bank of Hope was listed to be the mortgage lender to this mall.

==== Fu Zhou Wei Zhong Wei Jia Xiang Feng Wei ====
In the basement of the East Broadway Mall, there is a Fuzhou style small eatery stand that has been around since the 2000s called Fu Zhou Wei Zhong Wei Jia Xiang Feng Wei(福州味中味家鄉風味), literal English translation is Fuzhou Hometown Flavor. Despite the deterioration of the pedestrian and economic traffic into this mall, this particular stand continues to receive a lot of customers helping them maintain profits to keep the business alive and afford the rent. Initially their customer base was entirely Fuzhou speakers locally from the neighborhood, from other parts of the city, and out of state when the Fuzhou community and this mall was at its prosperous prime and peak levels in the early to mid 2000s. However, as mentioned before, gentrification since the late 2000s and most especially since the 2010s onward has been rapidly shifting the demographics of the neighborhood to an increasingly growing high income hipster community and a declining Fuzhou community, this eatery's Fuzhou customer base has been sharply declining. But due to social media attention over this eatery stand since the 2010s, they have been receiving a lot of non-Asian and Americanized Asian customers with a mix of them being tourists or visitors and even high income hipsters now living locally in the community where they are now increasingly the main majority customer base. Their remaining loyal Fuzhou customer base have shrunken dramatically over the years, which are now mainly the remaining long time neighborhood locals.

=== Oriental Plaza ===
Since 2000, another Chinese mini mall also opened at 75 East Broadway, which is the former location of Sun Sing Movie Theater just across from East Broadway Mall. The mall in Chinese is called 東方商場, which the literal translation is East Coast Mall, but according to an October 2022 article from Curbed, they call it Oriental Plaza. Like East Broadway Mall, they were once populated primarily by Fuzhou style storefronts during the 2000s including having a large number of Fuzhou Chinese customers from the local neighborhood and from other parts of the city including from outside of New York State frequenting and shopping at this mini mall contributing very great prosperity just like the East Broadway Mall, but since the 2010s, vacancies slowly began to increase as a result of gentrification and increasing property values/rent as well as the continuous migration of Chinese Fuzhou speakers from the neighborhood with many relocating to the newer and much larger Fuzhou community in Sunset Park Brooklyn and with the Fuzhou Chinese speakers coming from other parts of the city and from out of New York State that once frequented East Broadway for commerce and errands have largely shifted to Sunset Park Brooklyn's newer and much larger Fuzhou community for all of these needs, this has contributed to a dramatic decline in customers to this mall meeting a very similar fate like East Broadway Mall and for a certain period of time in the 2010s, their whole entire second floor's storefronts were empty until in 2016 when a potential non-Asian business owner name Simon Gabriel was trying to search for a low rent location in downtown Manhattan to open up a music store after the store he worked in called, Other Music for 20 years in the East Village at E. 4th Street closed down and upon coming across Oriental Plaza mini mall and meeting with the mall's operators, Winking Group, he became the first non-Asian person to rent a storefront on the second floor opening up his music shop named 2 Bridges Music Art. Winking Group commented that they were looking for different types of tenants to diversify the culture of the mini mall and looking for professional artists were their ideal storefront tenants. Very soon, this attracted a very large influx of Non-Asian professional artists and clothing designers to open up shops on the second floor eventually transforming the whole entire second floor into a gentrified artist and fashion business district and often hosting fashion and cultural art events, which Simon Gabriel expressed discontent that his own arrival to this mini mall attracted large numbers of professional artists to demand renting these storefronts causing the rental property values to go up, which affected his rent to go up as it was his original intention to have an affordable storefront rent at the location. The first floor of the mini mall is still mainly occupied by Fuzhou Chinese shopkeepers, but are financially struggling to keep their businesses open due to increasing rent prices and as well as the numbers of Chinese Fuzhou customers frequenting this mini mall has been drastically declining over the years. This mini mall is now pretty much equally populated by Fuzhou Chinese shopkeepers and Non-Asian hipster shopkeepers, which are primarily Caucasians though people of other races also have shops here as well. There have been some linguistic and cultural conflicts between the Chinese Fuzhou shop keepers and the Non-Asian shopkeepers at this mall and sometimes being very socially and culturally disconnected from each other. There was an incident where a transgender white woman who works at the storefront in the mall was using the woman's bathroom, which created conflicts with two middle aged female Chinese workers when they were also using the same bathroom uncomfortably scaring them, which resulted in one of the Chinese shopkeepers who could speak English to have to step in to translate and defuse the situation and this is one of the examples of the social and cultural conflicts that happened at this mini mall. However, with the increasing gentrification in the neighborhood and now with this mall already half gentrified, this is leading to the likelihood that the demographics of the shopkeepers including customers may continuously shift to majority Non-Asians eventually in the future.

=== New York Supermarket ===
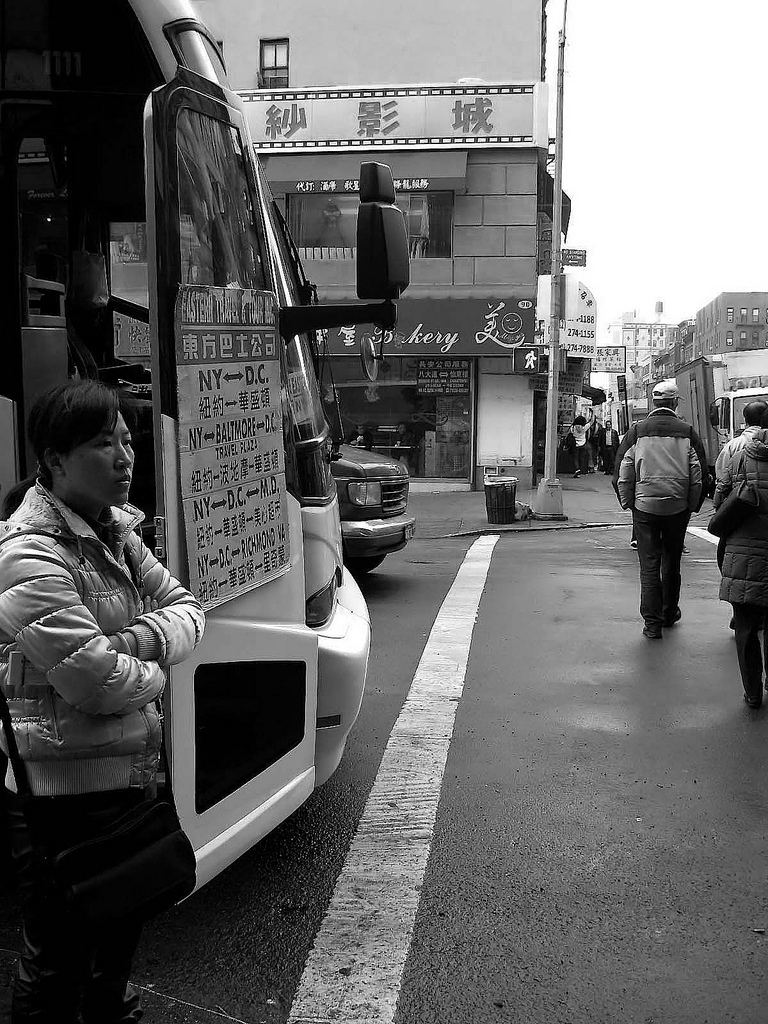
Bus ticket saleswoman at the corner of East Broadway and Forsyth Street in the Little Fuzhou neighborhood within Manhattan's Chinatown.

Under the Manhattan Bridge, there is also a New York Supermarket serving to the Fuzhou community as the largest Chinese Supermarket selling different food varieties. There was also another large supermarket named Hong Kong Supermarket located on this street, however it was destroyed in a fire. Parallel to this newly established Fuzhou community, another New York Supermarket also opened up on Mott Street and as well as a new Hong Kong Supermarket opened on the corner of Elizabeth Street and Hester Street serving as the largest Chinese supermarkets within the long-established Cantonese community on the other side of Manhattan's Chinatown.

=== Jewish Daily Forward Building ===
The Jewish Daily Forward erected a ten-story office building at 175 East Broadway, designed by architect George Boehm and completed in 1912. It was a prime location, across the street from Seward Park. The building was embellished with marble columns and panels and stained glass windows. The facade features carved bas relief portraits of Karl Marx, Friedrich Engels, (who co-authored, with Marx, The Communist Manifesto) and Ferdinand Lassalle, founder of the first mass German labor party. A fourth relief portrays a person whose identity has not been clearly established, and has been identified as Wilhelm Liebknecht, Karl Liebknecht, or August Bebel. In the real estate boom of the 1990s, the building was converted to condominiums.

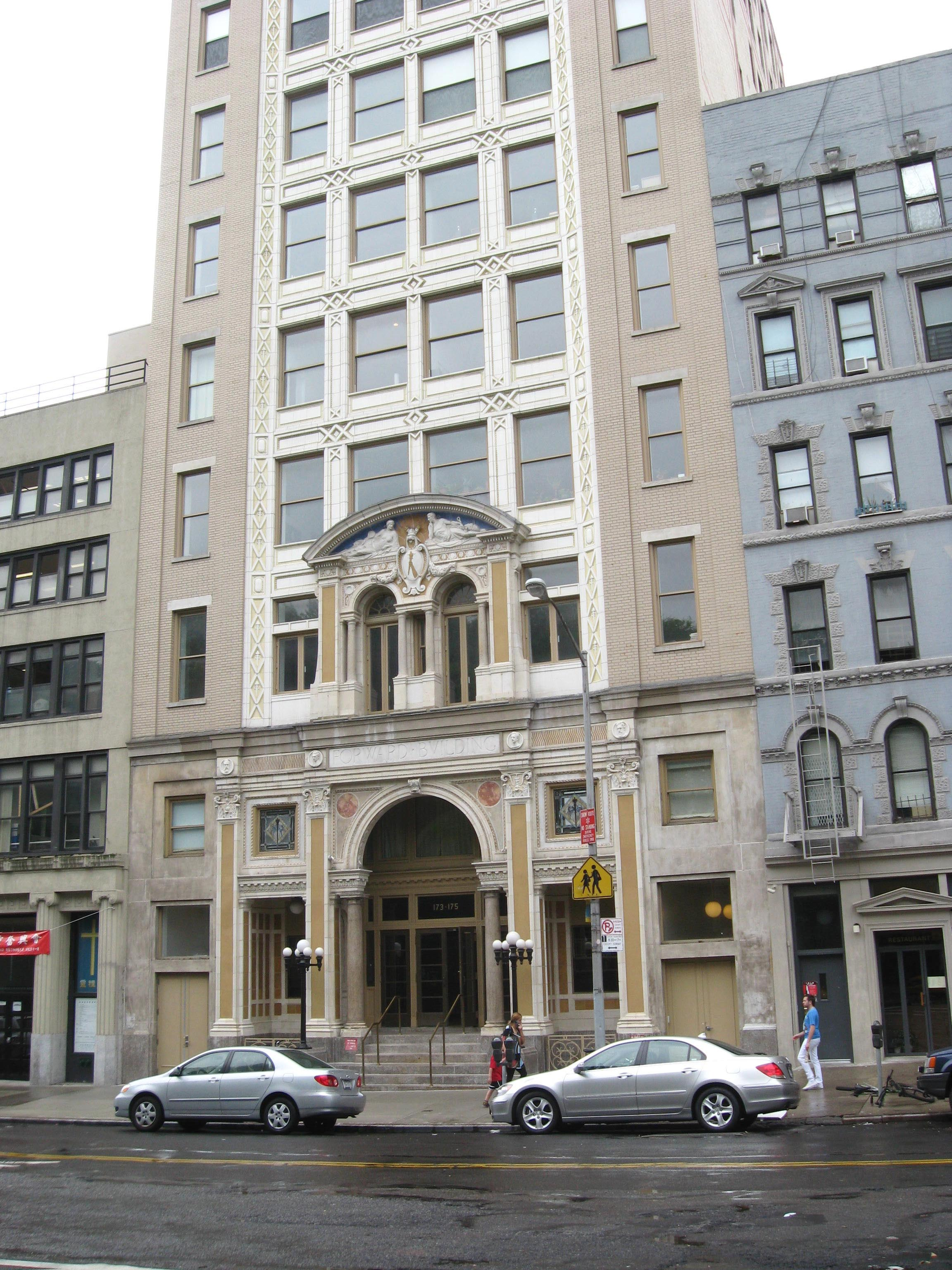
Forward Building Facade

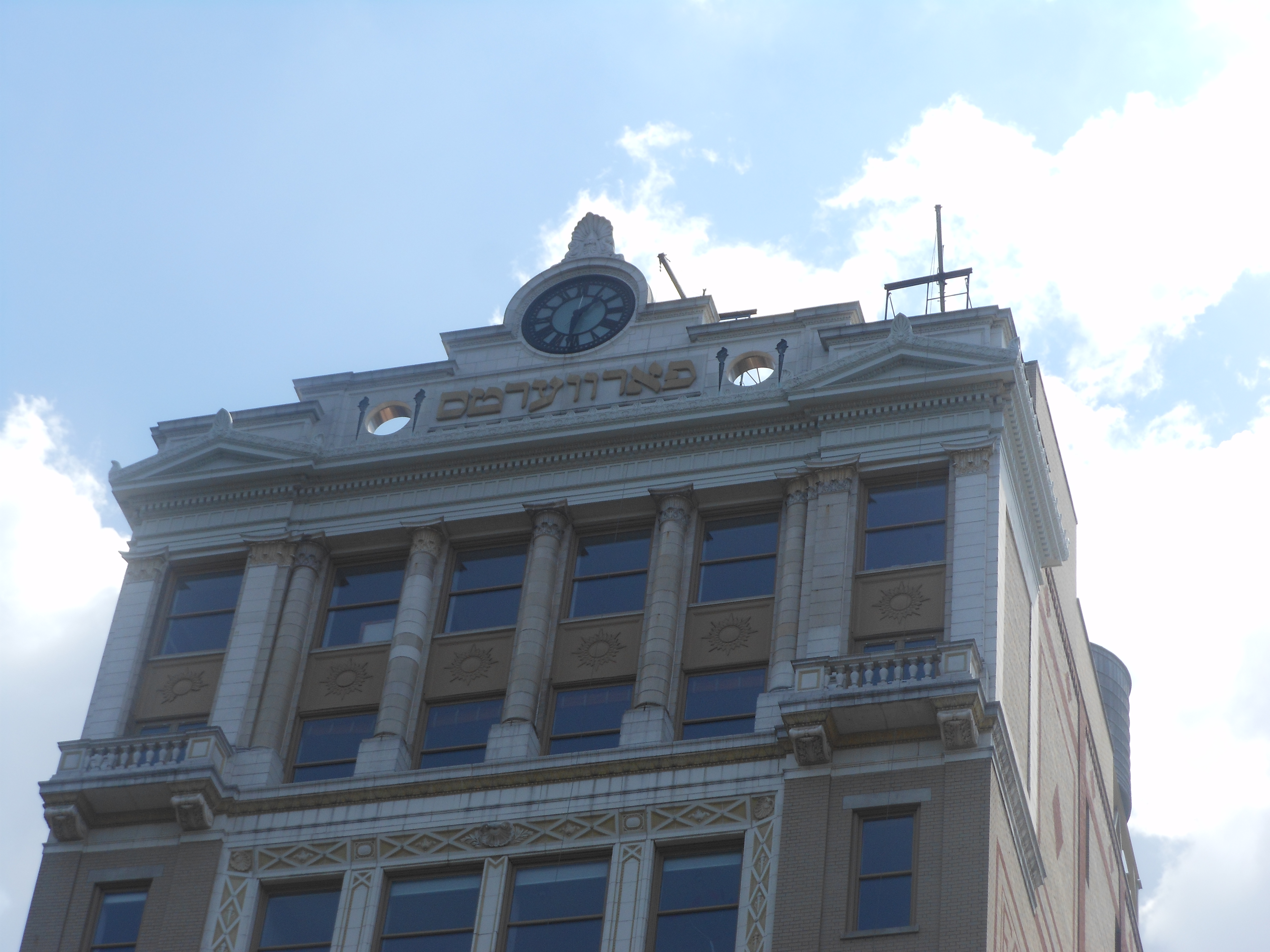
Top of Forward Building

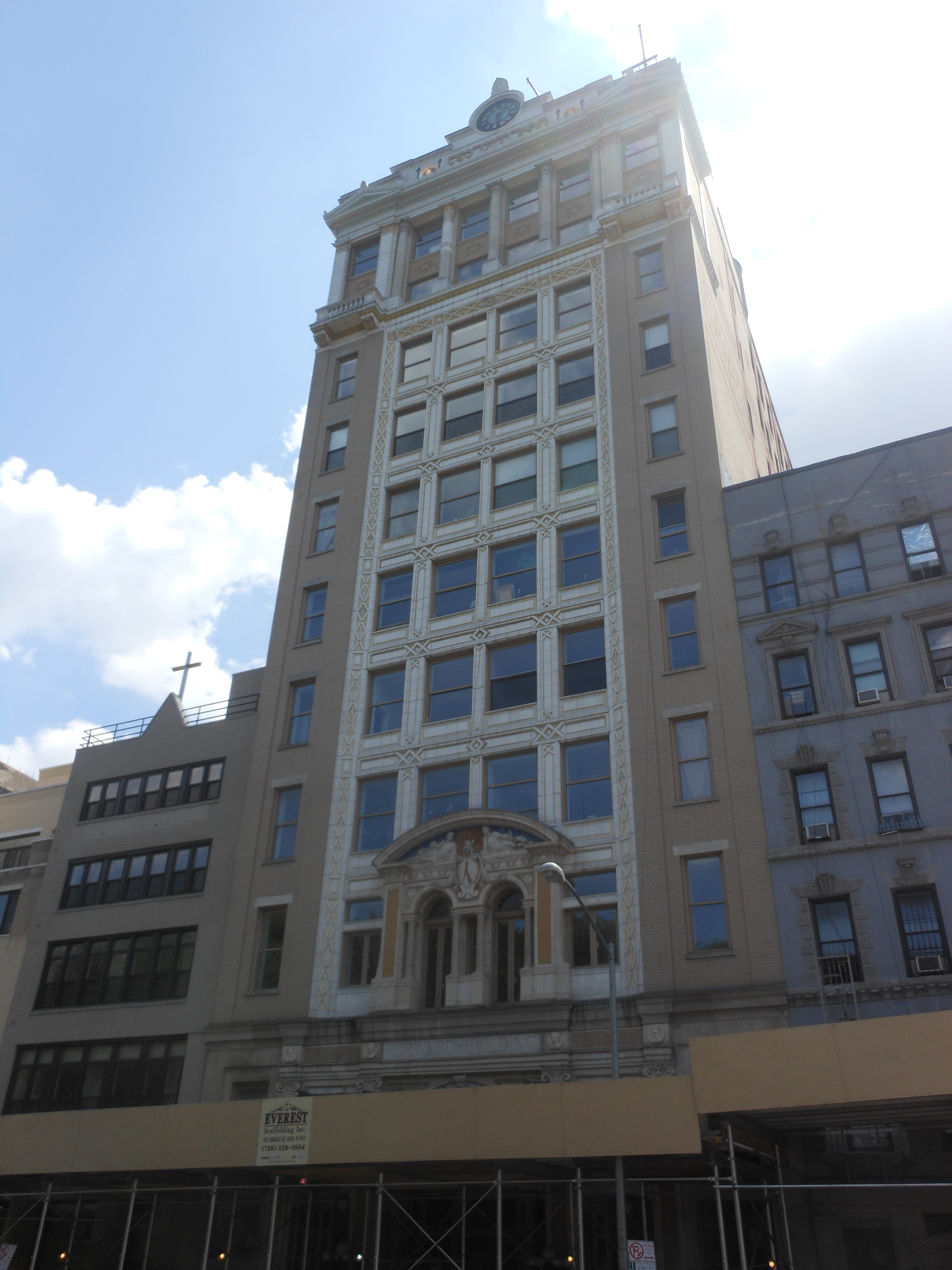
Front View of Forward Building

=== Seward Park ===
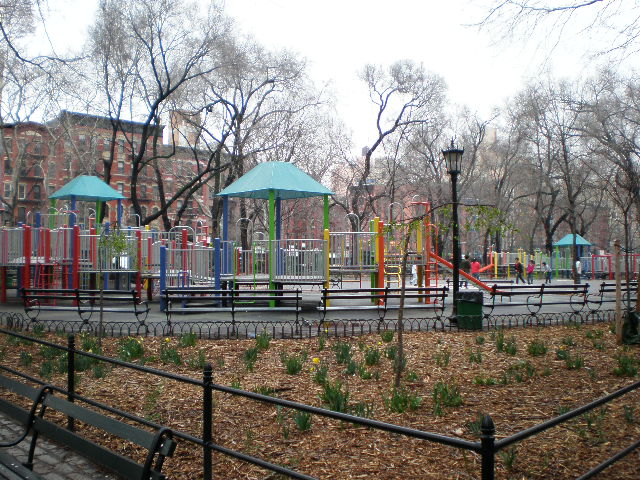
Playground at Seward Park

Seward Park, at the northeast corner of East Broadway and Straus Square, is 3.046 acres (12,330 m^{2}) in size and is the first municipally built playground in the United States.

== Transportation ==
The M9 bus runs on East Broadway in both directions between Chatham Square and Canal Street. The downtown M22 bus runs westward on East Broadway between Pike Street and Chatham Square. The East Broadway station of the IND Sixth Avenue Line (F and <F> trains) is located at East Broadway and Rutgers Street.

Since 1998, the New York City Department of Transportation has marked the sidewalk along Forsyth Street between Division Street and East Broadway as a de facto terminal for Chinatown bus lines.
