= Alfred E. Smith Houses =

Public housing development in Manhattan, New York

- NYCHA property
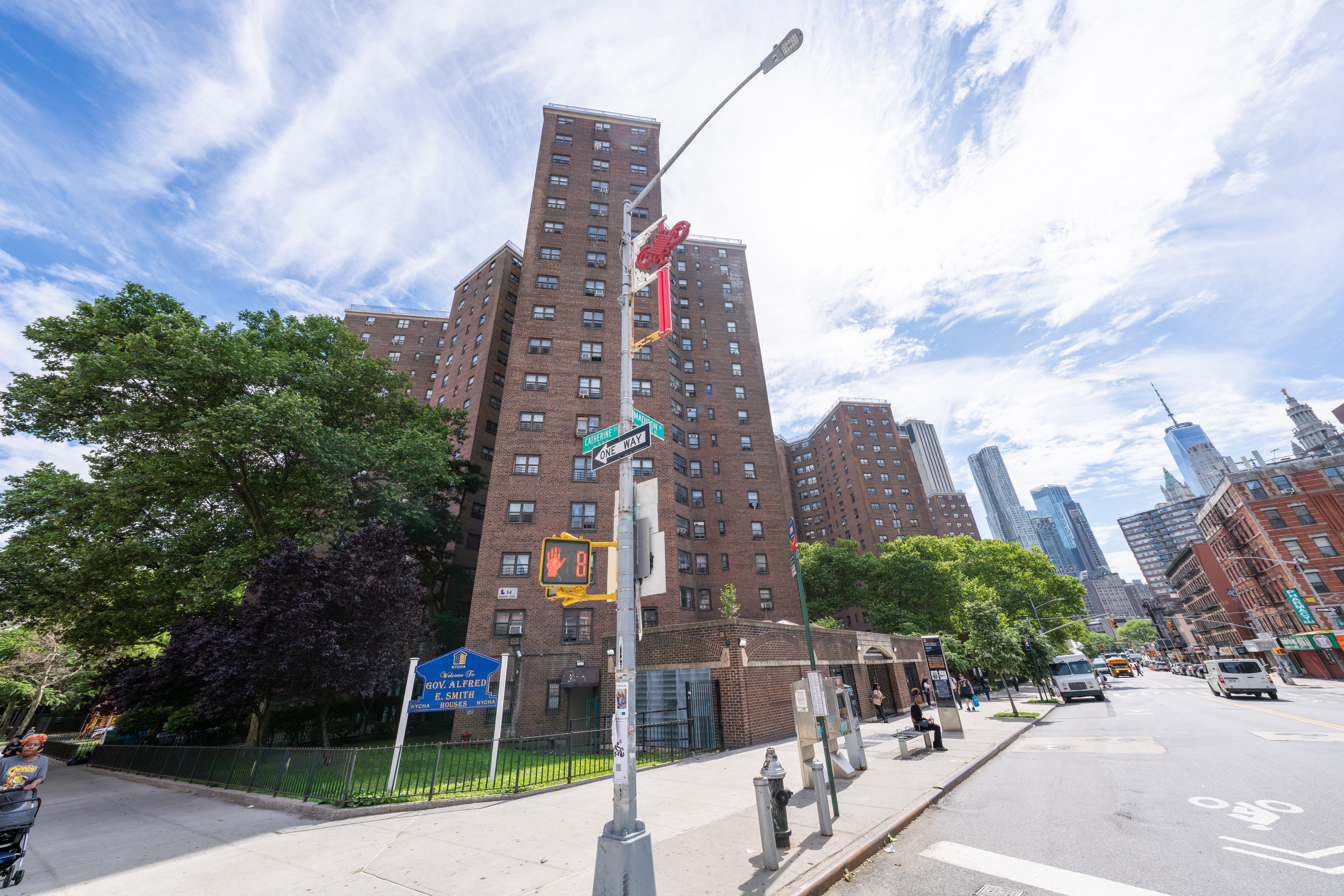
- The Alfred E. Smith Houses towers in 2026
- Interactive map of Alfred E. Smith Houses
- Coordinates: 40.711°N 73.999°W
- Country: United States
- State: New York
- City: New York City
- Borough: Manhattan

Area
  - Total: 0.033 sq mi (0.085 km^{2})

Population
  - Total: 4,232
  - Density: 130,000/sq mi (50,000/km^{2})
- ZIP codes: 10038
- Area codes: 212, 332, 646, and 917
- Website: my.nycha.info/DevPortal/

Governor Alfred E. Smith Houses, or the Alfred E. Smith Houses is a public housing development built by the New York City Housing Authority in the Two Bridges neighborhood of the Lower East Side of Manhattan. There are 12 buildings in the complex; all are 17 stories tall. It covers 21.75 acres (8.80 ha), has 1,931 apartments, and houses an estimated 5,739 people. The grounds are bordered by St. James Place to the west, Madison Street to the north, Catherine Street to the east, and South Street to the south.

== About ==
The razing of buildings for the construction of the complex began in 1950, and the buildings were completed on April 1, 1953.

The key sponsor of the development was State assemblyman John J. Lamula and it was named after four-time New York Governor Al Smith (1873–1944), the first Catholic to win a Presidential nomination by a major political party and a social reformer who made progress in the areas of better living and working conditions. Smith served as governor from 1919–1920 and 1923–1929, and was nominated unsuccessfully by the Democratic Party in 1928, with Joseph Taylor Robinson as his running mate. Nearby are the Alfred E. Smith Park, a 2.77-acre (1.12 ha) park with memorials for Governor Smith located at the corner of South St, Catherine Slip, and Madison St, the Alfred E. Smith Recreational Center, which has community rooms and a gymnasium, and P.S. 126.

Of the residents at the Governor Alfred E. Smith Houses, 30% were elderly as of 2010, then the highest such percentage of all public housing developments in New York City.

== Notable people ==
- Luther Vandross (1951 – 2005), singer and record producer.
- Michael Che (born 1983), comedian.

== See also ==
- New York City Housing Authority
- List of New York City Housing Authority properties
