= Division Street (Manhattan) =

Street in Manhattan, New York

Coordinates: 40°42′51″N 73°59′43″W

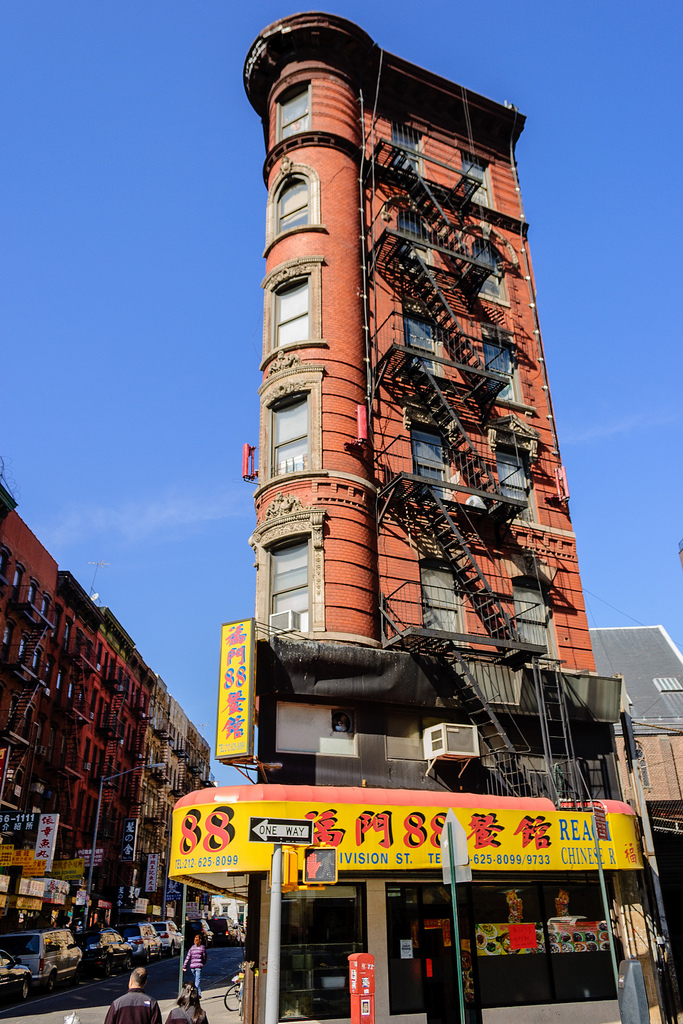
The Lian Jiang restaurant at 88 Division and Eldridge Street

Division Street (Chinese: 地威臣街) is a one-way street in the Two Bridges neighborhood of Lower Manhattan in New York City. It carries westbound traffic from the intersection of Canal Street and Ludlow Street westward to Bowery.

== History ==
The street dates back to before 1789. Its namesake is the division it marks between the street grid patterns on either side of it.

A segment of the IRT Second Avenue Line used to run along Division Street between Bowery and Allen Street.

The portion of Division Street under the Manhattan Bridge is used for a mall called the East Broadway Mall. There is a car park at Market Street (formerly Florence Place) and next to it is the PS 124 Yung Wing Elementary School. The school is part of a residential complex called Confucius Plaza. At this point, the street widens. Buses to Flushing and casinos park on the right side. There used to be a greenmarket until it moved to the space under the Manhattan Bridge on Forsyth Street between Canal Street and Division Street. East of Bowery, there is a statue of Confucius. At Bowery, most of the traffic gets diverted to the Bowery, Chatham Square, and the Manhattan Bridge.

== Points of interest ==
- Seward Park (on Canal and Essex Street)
- Confucius Plaza
- Agia Barbara (on Forsyth Street)
- Eldridge Street Synagogue (on Eldridge Street)
- East Broadway Mall
- Imperial Ballroom Dance Studio
