= Sea and Land Church =

Church in Manhattan, New York

- U.S. National Register of Historic Places
- U.S. Historic district – Contributing property
- New York State Register of Historic Places
- New York City Landmark
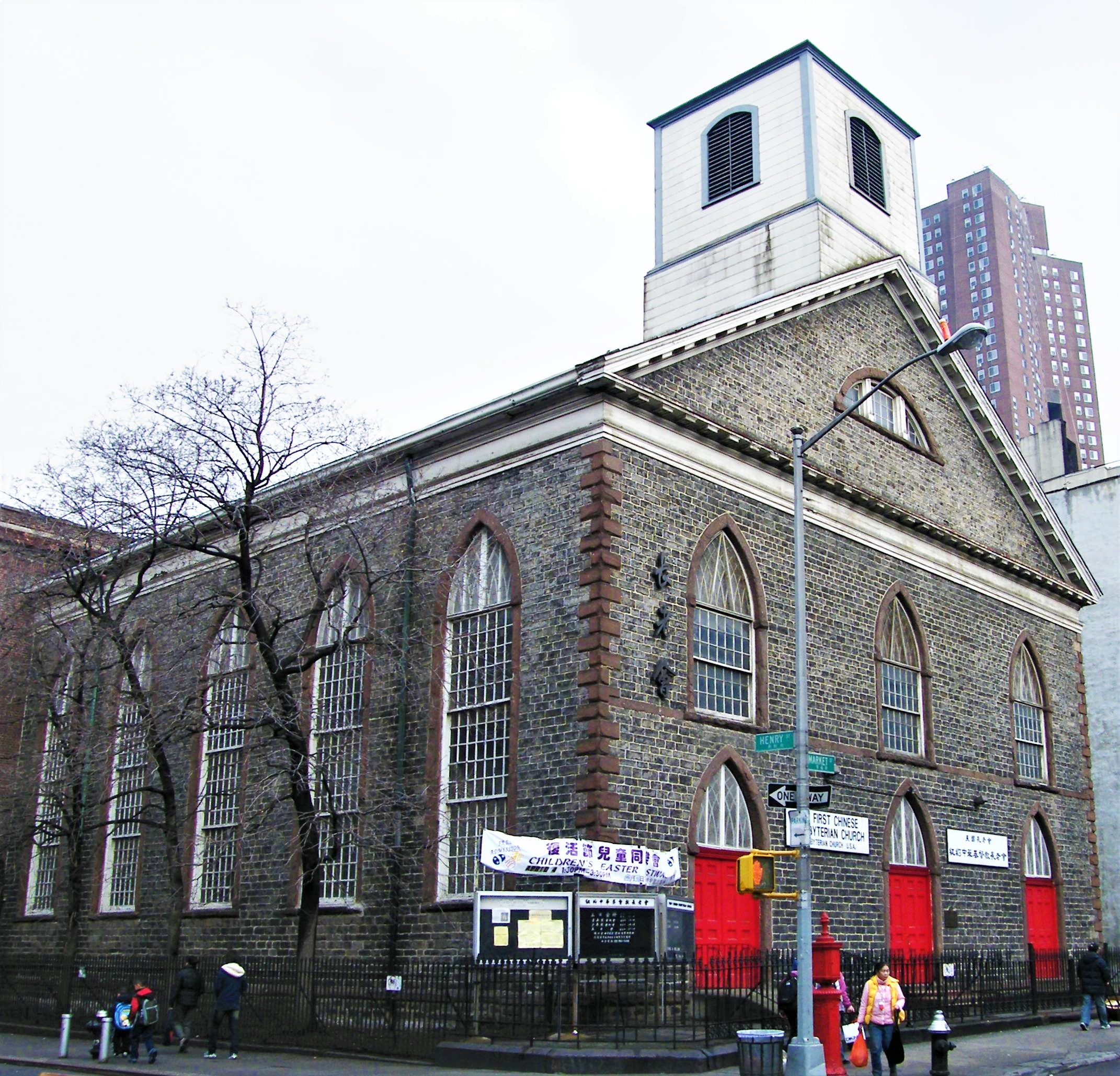
- Location: 61 Henry St., New York, New York
- Coordinates: 40°42′47″N 73°59′41″W
- Built: 1819
- Architectural style: Georgian, Gothic Revival
- Part of: Two Bridges Historic District (ID03000845)
- NRHP reference No.: 80002716
- NYSRHP No.: 06101.000099
- NYCL No.: 0094

Significant dates
- Added to NRHP: April 9, 1980
- Designated CP: August 29, 2003
- Designated NYSRHP: June 23, 1980
- Designated NYCL: January 18, 1966

The Sea and Land Church (known as the Northeast Dutch Reformed Church until 1864) is located at 61 Henry Street and Market Street in the Chinatown and Two Bridges neighborhoods of Manhattan in New York City. It was built in 1819 of Manhattan schist, and added to the National Register of Historic Places on April 9, 1980. The structure is one of the three Georgian Gothic Revival churches on the Lower East Side with the other ones being St. Augustine's Chapel and the Church of the Transfiguration. It is also the second oldest church building in New York City.

The church stands on land that was once part of Henry Rutgers' estate, which he donated in 1816 to establish the Northeast Dutch Reformed Church (also known as the Market Street Church). Rutgers served on the consistory. Noted minister Theodore L. Cuyler was pastor from 1853 to 1860 when he accepted a position at Park Presbyterian Church in Brooklyn. The church's organ was built by Henry Erben and dates to 1841.

By 1866, most of the Dutch Reformed congregation had moved uptown, and shipping merchant Hanson K. Corning purchased the building on behalf of the Presbytery of New-York to serve seamen and their families. The Sea and Land Church sponsored steamboat excursions for its Sunday School to Dudley's Grove, just below Hastings-on-Hudson. In 1894, the church affiliated with the Madison Square Presbyterian Church as a means of survival, but this did not last.

Since 1951, the church building has been used by the First Chinese Presbyterian Church, a congregation of the Presbyterian Church (USA), which shared the site with the Sea and Land Church until 1972 when that congregation was dissolved. In 1974 the Presbytery of New York City officially transferred the church building to the First Chinese Presbyterian Church.

== See also ==
- National Register of Historic Places listings in Manhattan below 14th Street
- List of New York City Designated Landmarks in Manhattan below 14th Street
