= Hamilton-Madison House =

Settlement house in New York City

Coordinates: 40.71192°N 73.99790°W

Hamilton-Madison House is a 501(c)(3), non-profit settlement house dedicated to improving the quality of life of its community, primarily that of the Two Bridges/Chinatown area of the Lower East Side of Manhattan, New York City, United States. The neighborhood is a federally designated poverty area, with a constantly changing mixture of ethnic groups, which historically lacked adequate community services and programs. An average income of a family living in the area is $17,000. Further, more than 25% of the seniors live on less than $15,000 a year, of which 40% goes toward housing. Over the past 127 years, Hamilton-Madison House has offered social services, educational and healthcare programs that meet the changing community needs. Initially, the organization supported mostly Irish, Italian and Jewish immigrant communities but as immigration demographics have changed, so too have the demographics for the community that Hamilton-Madison House supports. From 1965, and after a change in federal immigration policies, the community's predominant immigrants became Chinese New Yorkers. The organization's staff has grown to include a staff of 300 who collectively speak 15 languages, including 6 Chinese dialects. Further, Hamilton-Madison House’s long-standing programs have been adapted to meet the cultural norms of this expanding population.

== History ==
Between 1880 and 1923, during the height of the exodus from the Old World, Jewish immigrants from all over Europe moved into crowded tenements on Manhattan's Lower East Side. Most were refugees who fled from pogroms, degrading poverty or the suppression of human rights.

Later, African Americans and then Irish immigrants settled in the shadows of the two mighty bridges spanning the East River. They found work on the wharves loading and unloading bags of sugar, tea, coffee and spices that came from countries like the ones they left behind.

In 1898, two young East European idealists founded the Madison House of the Downtown Ethical society to fight some of the serious problems of the day. These youths were disciples of Dr. Felix Adler, founder of the Society for Ethical Culture. (1876) Several influential women of the time were active in Madison House, including Bella Moses—the mother of Robert Moses—who served as trustee for Madison House.

The slums had rapidly become lethal chambers of disease. Tuberculosis, pneumonia, typhoid, and diphtheria spread rampantly among the immigrants claiming one entire block after another. One such block, an Italian and Sicilian enclave, was Hamilton Street.

In response to the epidemic, Lillian Wald of the Henry Street Settlement established a small "outpost" on Hamilton Street in 1902. Originally designed to serve public health needs of newly arrived Italian immigrants, Hamilton House soon began serving the youths of the community through a variety of programs.

The Lower East Side of New York, home to these humanitarian organizations, underwent a metamorphosis. As waves of immigrants shifted from European to Asian and Hispanic both Hamilton House and Madison House went through many changes in order to meet the needs of the community. A landmark change for both settlement houses occurred in 1954 when they combined to become Hamilton-Madison House.

Oliver and Madison streets, 2018

== Programs ==
ESL Hamilton-Madison House's ESL Program (English as a Second Language) offers free morning classes, from beginner to advanced levels. The Program also offers trips, presentations, and guest speakers.

The Women Talk Program provides a culturally sensitive environment, in which women are taught to communicate effectively in English and are assisted with the transition to living and working outside of the Two Bridges/Chinatown community.

Behavioral Health Currently serving more than 5,000 clients a year, Hamilton-Madison House's Behavioral Health Services has language-specific clinics that take into account a client's ethnicity and native language. In 2002, the Korean Clinic and the Southeast Asian Clinic expanded to meet the growing needs of the community. Clinicians are now available for residents who speak Vietnamese, Cambodian, and Laotian.

Child Care Centers Hamilton-Madison House Child Care Centers are a collaboration of Head Start and Day Care Programs. Childcare is provided at eight sites; each year over 280 children, ages 2–5, are served as well as 50 children, ages 6–12 in school age day care.

Chinatown Resource Center

The Chinatown Resource Center (CRC) is a focal point of Hamilton-Madison's effort to meet the psychological, economic and social needs of area residents, workers and businesses who were affected by September 11th. The center works to empower the community and to promote its recovery through a holistic approach by providing behavioral health services, consultation, education, workshops, and advocacy.

Senior Services During 2006–2007 over 6,500 seniors, who live in the Two Bridges/Chinatown community and throughout New York City, attended Hamilton-Madison House's four senior service locations.

Supported Housing The goal of Hamilton-Madison House's Supported Housing is to provide permanent housing for people who are seriously and persistently mentally ill to live independently. Supported Housing provides 43 beds to Asian American mentally ill patients—15 fully furnished apartments at a single site and 9 fully furnished apartments at scattered sites. The admission criteria are 18 years of age and older with documented history of mental disability and psychiatric treatment. The services for tenants are bi-lingual and bi-cultural case management, social, cultural, and recreational programs.

Two Bridges Tower Community Program Hamilton-Madison House is contracted to provide social services to tenants of 82 Rutgers Slip, a model housing program. The goal of this program is to improve the quality of life for 200 families living in the building. People come from a wide variety of social and economic conditions and the residents of 60 apartments are families that had been homeless. The house provides After School and Summer Camp to children ages 5–12. A number of evening activities are available to adults and teens. People are encouraged to develop links to various agencies in the community.

Youth Development Programs

Children ages 5–12 After School Program operates 2:30–6:00 p.m. for 38 weeks between September and June, paralleling the school calendar. This program provides school pick up, supervised and mandatory homework completion, individual and group tutoring, arts and crafts, computer literacy, yoga, life skills, and a nutritious meal. Summer Day Camp is a seven-week program that provides activities for the children to learn teamwork and sportsmanship as well as develop increased communication skills and empathy. The Saturday Program consists of Sports, Chinese classes, violin classes, and one-on-one homework assistance is available. The computer lab is also open for classes and independent use.

Ages 13–21 Teen Program – 50 Madison Street is open weeknights for the teens and gives them a safe environment to socialize with their friends, receive homework assistance, speak with a social worker, play pick-up basketball, engage in HIV/AIDS peer education, and surf the net. In addition, Makin' Da Music, an innovative DJ-training program, is offered to teens ages 15–17. The participants learn the fundamentals of spinning discs, the history of music, working an audience, and developing entrepreneurial skills.

== Timeline ==
1898 In Spring, Madison House of the Downtown Ethical Society is founded at 300 Madison Street.

1900 Under the leadership of board member, Bella Moses, mother of Robert Moses, Madison House embarks construction of a permanent summer camp.

1902 Hamilton House is founded on Hamilton Street. On June 17 Hamilton House is incorporated.

1910 Madison House acquires a building at 216 Madison Street.

1915 In November, Hamilton House moves from Hamilton Street to 72 Market Street.

1920 In September, the summer camps are replaced by Camp Rossbach for both boys and girls at Tomkins' Corners near Peekskill. This camp later becomes Camp Madison and later is known as Camp Madison-Felicia.

1925 In the mid-twenties, Madison House is incorporated.

1926 Dr. Algernon Black becomes Headworker at Madison House until 1930.

1929 The building at 226 Madison Street is completed

1930 During the next ten years, Madison House provides facilities for WPA workers who serve the neighborhood's cultural, health and social needs.

1941 World War II starts. Mrs. Josiah Willard, President of Hamilton House, from 1952 to 1954 and Helen Greenebaum, Headworker, share the task of managing the House during the war years.

1947 The neighborhood population becomes primarily by African Americans and Latinos. Friction between the pre-war community and the newcomers escalates. Teenage gangs present an acute problem. Geoffrey Wiener is Headworker. Helen Hall, Headworker of Henry Street Settlement and a member of the Hamilton House Board, urges Mr. Wiener on. The budget is $12,000, with a deficit carried by Henry Street Settlement House.

1950 In the 1950s the first Hamilton-Madison House Thrift Store opens on Madison Street. The thrift store moves uptown to Third Avenue and moves again on Third Avenue before locating on Second Avenue.

1951 The Golden Age Group of Chinatown is established as a group of Chinese senior citizens at Hamilton House.

1952 In February, Hamilton House offers counseling and family care work as an experimental project through an arrangement with the Family Services Division of the Community Service Society of New York.

1953 When the second half of Smith Houses is completed, a community space and a 55 child pre-school Day Care Center are allocated. Hamilton House is named the sponsor. In a dedication ceremony in March 1953, Eleanor Roosevelt is the principal speaker.

1954 Hamilton House and Madison House merge.

1954 Shirley Chisholm is named the Director of the Child Care Center of Hamilton-Madison House.

1955 The Two Bridge Neighborhood Council is founded and flourishes as a community wide citizen's action organization.

1967 Hamilton-Madison House establishes an Adolescent Service Center on an experimental basis. The Tenants' Association, an independent body of tenants of Smith Houses, functions out of Hamilton-Madison House.

1969 Hamilton-Madison House establishes Big Brother and Sister Corps and Services to Chinese Immigrants.

1970 Susan Chan is hired as a social worker for a Chinese Immigrant Program at Hamilton-Madison House.

1973 Hamilton-Madison House celebrates its 75th anniversary with a party on the South Street Seaport Pier, on May 17

1974 The Chinatown Children's Consultation Center (CCCC), the first such mental health facility in New York City, opens on May 29 at 103 Canal Street.

1974 In May, Hamilton-Madison House and other Lower East Side Settlements found the Lower East Side Family Union, an agency designed to work with problem families to prevent foster care placement of their children.

1976 In January, Frank T. Modica becomes executive director of Hamilton-Madison House.

1978 The Chinatown Family Consultation Center moves to 46 Henry Street.

1978 The First Chinese Banquet Benefit is held in December.

1979 Short-term programs are set up to aid the Indo-Chinese boat people. The Chinatown Family Consultation Center treats Chinese patients in 12 dialects

1980 The Indo-Chinese Refugee Program is funded in February 1980 by the State Department of Social Services through a joint proposal submitted by Hamilton-Madison House and the Chinatown Planning Council.

1981 Helen Hall, a celebrated leader in the settlement movement and social services and the Honorary Chairperson of Hamilton-Madison House, dies.

1981 Head Start expands from 95 to 145 children. An additional classroom is rented for the program at PS 126.

1982 Hamilton-Madison House is asked by the State Office of Mental Health to help design and sponsor a unique, new program: The Asian American Mental Health Demonstration Project. In the fall, specialized bilingual, bicultural services begin for the city's Chinese, Korean, Japanese and Southeast Asian communities. The programs are sensitive to the special needs of Asians in New York City.

1983 Hamilton-Madison House opens its first office in another borough, the Korean Clinic in Flushing.

1983 In January, the Chinatown Alcoholism Project begins the first of its kind in the nation. Activities focus on community education, outreach counseling, information, referral and networking.

1983 Two grants from the Federation of Protestant Welfare Agencies help Hamilton-Madison House to bring together the churches and synagogues in the area to come up with beds for the homeless.

1985 The Asian American Mental Health Services becomes funded completely by the NYC Department of Mental Health as a permanent program.

1986 Hamilton-Madison House celebrates the settlement movement centennial with a black-tie benefit on Thursday, June 5. Four prominent settlement workers and alumni of Hamilton-Madison House are honored: Dr. Algernon Black, Helen L. Buttenweiser, Shirley Chisholm Hardwick and Lillian Robbins.

1987 The Korean Clinic moves Elmhurst, Queens.

1988 First tenants move into Two Bridges Neighborhood Council's Helen Harris Apartments. Senior Services expand. A daily hot lunch program for seniors is introduced. Through an intergenerational program, teens are hired to escort homebound seniors to visit doctors, banks and to shop. New bonds of understanding and trust are being forged between generations.

1990 The Bicultural/Bilingual Chinese Master of Social Work Project is initiated in cooperation with the Hunter School of Social Work

1991 HMH resumes The Golden Age Group of Chinatown renaming it the H.M.H, City Hall Senior Center. It expands during the following years to serve more than 3,000 Chinese from Manhattan and the other boroughs of New York City.

1992 The Ryan White Teen Outreach Project is established. It attended to the needs of the HIV/AIDS at-risk and affected youth and their families in Smith Houses and the Catherine Street Family Respite Center.

1993 Hamilton-Madison House celebrates its 95th birthday. Dedication of the Children's Mural Project for the HMH gymnasium takes place.

1994 Hamilton-Madison House opens a Supported Housing facility in Queens, the only one of its kind specializing in permanent housing for Asian American mental health patients.

1995 Susan Chan, Associate Executive Director, represented the International Federation of Settlements and Neighborhood Centers to participate at the United Nations Fourth World Conference on Women in Beijing. She also attended the Non-Governmental Organization Conference in Beijing in August.

1995 John S. Karger and Eugenia Willard were honored for their long commitment to Hamilton-Madison House Mr. Karger, a member of the Board of Directors, began as a volunteer in the After School Program in the 1930s. In 1988 he joined the Board of Directors of Hamilton-Madison House and served as its president for two terms. Eugenia Willard began serving as a volunteer at Hamilton House during World War II. Mrs. Willard, a member of the Board of Directors since 1942 continued her volunteer work at the House and also served as president of Hamilton House from 1952 to 1954. Both continue to serve actively as Trustees on the Hamilton-Madison House Board of Trustees,

1996 The HMH Knickerbocker Village Senior Center opens its program in the Knickerbocker Village Apartment complex to serve approximately 300 seniors. A Senior Companion Program for homebound elderly, direct services and other activities attracts many isolated older adults to participate actively in life again.

1997 The Two Bridges Tower at 253 South Street, a residential building containing 138 units for mixed income families and 60 units for the formerly homeless opened. Two Bridges Neighborhood Council and Settlement Housing Fund built the Tower and Hamilton-Madison House and occupy two floors.

1997 In May 1997, a milestone is reached when HMH renowned multilingual, multicultural mental health programs are centralized at 253 South Street. The Korean Unit continues to operate out of its Queens location.

1997 Hamilton-Madison House's Head Start and Day Care Centers are centralized. Almost all of the programs in the newly organized Hamilton-Madison House Childcare Center offer services from 8:00 A.M. to 6:00 P.M. daily.

1997 Geoffrey R. Wiener is honored for his fifty years of continuous service to Hamilton-Madison House. Mr. Wiener began as Acting Head Worker (executive director) at Hamilton House in 1947 and continued to serve until 1954 when Hamilton House and Madison House merged. He then became the executive director of the newly formed settlement and served until 1963 while also serving on the board of directors. He has served since 1963 in various capacities on the HMH Board of Directors.

1997 Recognizing that computer literacy is as important to survival at work and school as learning English a Computer Center is established.

1998 The Centennial Year. Highlights for our Centennial included the 19th Annual Chinatown Banquet on March 27 at Jing Fong on Elizabeth Street; an HMH photo exhibit at the Tenement Museum on April 2; a Centennial Street Fair on September 26; and a Black Tie Gala held on November 9 at the Downtown Marriott. Program highlights include the closing of the Ryan White Teen Outreach Program and the initiation of the Teen Reach Program, the starting of the Women Talk Program, which combines English and computer classes for Chinese speaking women.

1998 Hamilton-Madison House embarks on its "Second Century of Service" to the Two Bridges/Chinatown community.

1998 Prevocational Training Program is initiated. Computer classes and a carpentry workshop help prepare area residents for the job market. A job developer/volunteer coordinator is hired to help with resume preparation and interview techniques.

1999 The Calder Foundation funds the new Children's Computer Literacy Center for kindergarten age children.

2001 In response to the September 11th attacks Hamilton-Madison House staff hire 10 new social workers, who provide grief and disaster counseling to children and adults. The free services are available in 10 languages including 5 dialects of Chinese

2002 The City Hall Senior Center moves to a new location at 100 Gold Street just in time to celebrate its 50-year anniversary in December.

2002 Hamilton-Madison House initiates the "Heritage Gala", by honoring its Italian heritage. $140,000 was raised for the endowment fund.

2003 New program highlights: Chinatown Resource Center opens at 202 Canal Street, in March; the Social Adult Day Program opens in June; the Sunrise Psychosocial Club opens in September; and the Korean Clinic moves to a new location in Jackson Heights, Queens. The Sunrise Social Club and the Korean Clinic are dedicated to Dr. Foo Chu.

2007 Hamilton-Madison House is among over 530 New York City arts and social service institutions to receive part of a $30 million grant from the Carnegie Corporation, which was made possible through a donation by New York City mayor Michael Bloomberg.
