= Alfred E. Smith House =

Historic house in Manhattan, New York

- U.S. National Register of Historic Places
- U.S. National Historic Landmark
- U.S. Historic district – Contributing property
- New York State Register of Historic Places
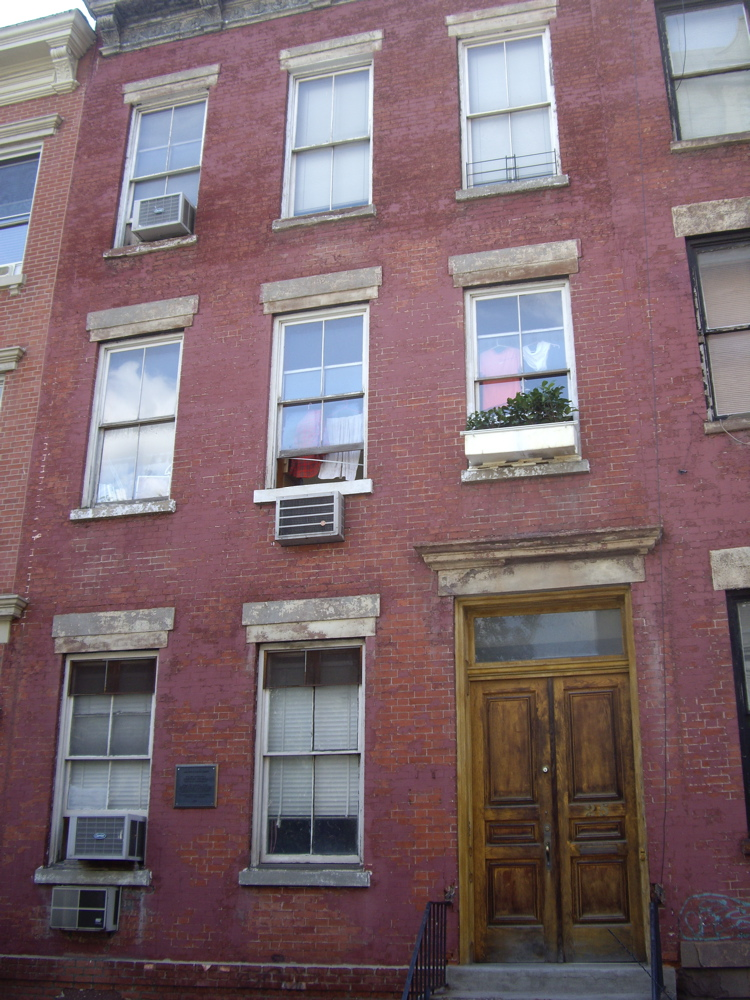

- Location within Lower Manhattan Location within New York Location within the United States
- Location: 25 Oliver Street, Manhattan, New York City, New York
- Coordinates: 40°42′43.6″N 73°59′54.6″W
- Area: 0.1 acres (0.040 ha)
- Built: c. 1880
- Architectural style: Victorian
- Part of: Two Bridges Historic District (ID03000845)
- NRHP reference No.: 72000882
- NYSRHP No.: 06101.001768

Significant dates
- Added to NRHP: November 28, 1972
- Designated NHL: November 28, 1972
- Designated CP: August 29, 2003
- Designated NYSRHP: June 23, 2003

The Alfred E. Smith House is a historic rowhouse at 25 Oliver Street in the Two Bridges section of Lower Manhattan. Probably built in the late 19th century, it was the home of four-time governor of New York State and 1928 Democratic presidential candidate Alfred E. Smith (1873-1944). Smith lived here from 1907 to 1923. The house was declared a National Historic Landmark in 1965.

== Description ==
The Alfred E. Smith House is an architecturally undistinguished three-story brick rowhouse, located on the west side of Oliver Street in Lower Manhattan, across the street from the Alfred E. Smith Elementary School. The building is three bays wide and crowned by a modillioned cornice. Its entrance is in the right bay, topped by a transom window and corniced entablature. The interior retains a number of original period Victorian features, including tile floors and a stairway newel post, but also has alterations that were probably made during the period of Alfred E. Smith's occupancy, including the provision of glass-windowed doors between the main hall and front parlor. Based on stylistic evidence, the house was probably built between 1870 and 1890.

== History ==
Al Smith occupied this house, which he leased from the nearby St. James Church, from 1907 until 1923. His biographers describe this period as important in forming his political views and philosophy, which propelled him into the New York governorship beginning in 1919, and to his ultimately unsuccessful run for United States President in the 1928 election. Smith's rise on the national stage marked a trend away from rural or small-town figures in national politics, and toward figures with more urban experiences. He was ultimately hampered in his success on the national stage by his Roman Catholicism, and by a decade of post-World War I prosperity which had largely been overseen by Republican administrations.

After Smith moved out of this building in 1923, it housed an undertaker until 1930. It was still owned by St. James Church, and occupied by a single tenant since 1930, at the time of its National Historic Landmark designation in 1972.

== See also ==
- National Register of Historic Places listings in Manhattan below 14th Street
- List of National Historic Landmarks in New York City
