= M22 (New York City bus) =

Bus route in Manhattan, New York

m22
- Madison and Chambers Street Crosstown
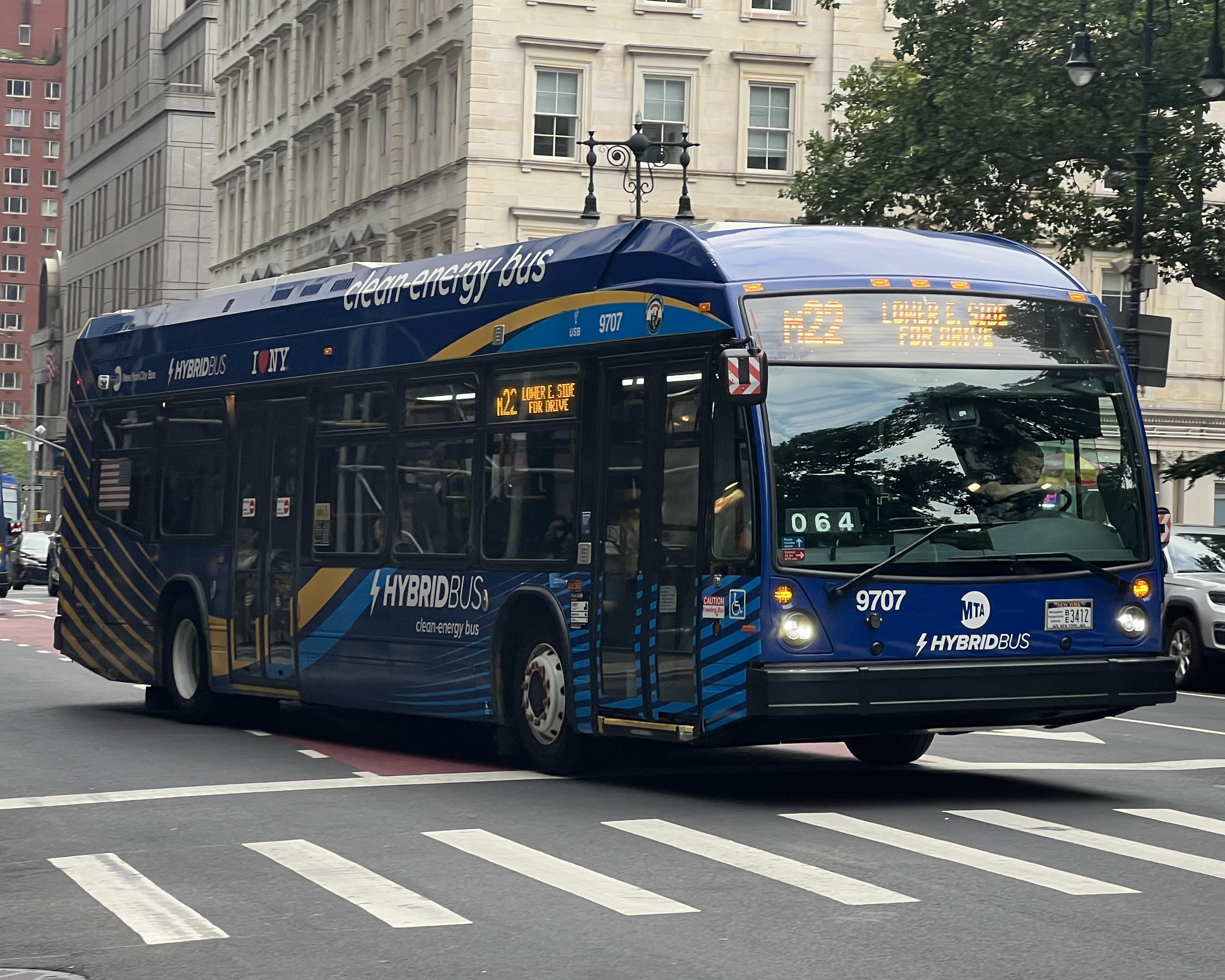
- A 2021 Nova Bus LFS HEV (9707) on the Lower East Side-bound M22 in 2024

Overview
- System: MTA Regional Bus Operations
- Operator: Manhattan and Bronx Surface Transit Operating Authority
- Garage: Michael J. Quill Depot
- Vehicle: New Flyer Xcelsior XD40; New Flyer Xcelsior XE40; Nova Bus LFS HEV

Route
- Locale: Manhattan, New York City, U.S.
- Communities served: Battery Park City, Tribeca, Financial District, Civic Center, Two Bridges, Chinatown, Lower East Side
- Start: Battery Park City – Vesey St and North End Ave
- Via: Madison Street and Chambers Street
- End: Lower East Side – Grand Street and FDR Drive
- Length: 2.8 miles (4.5 km)

Service
- Operates: Weekdays: 5:00 AM- 1:00 AM; Weekends: 7:00 AM - 10:00 PM
- Annual patronage: 464,320 (2025)
- Transfers: Yes
- Timetable: M22

The M22 bus route constitutes a public transit line in Manhattan, New York City. The M22 operates between Battery Park City and the Lower East Side, serving as a crosstown route along Madison Street and Chambers Street.

== Route description ==
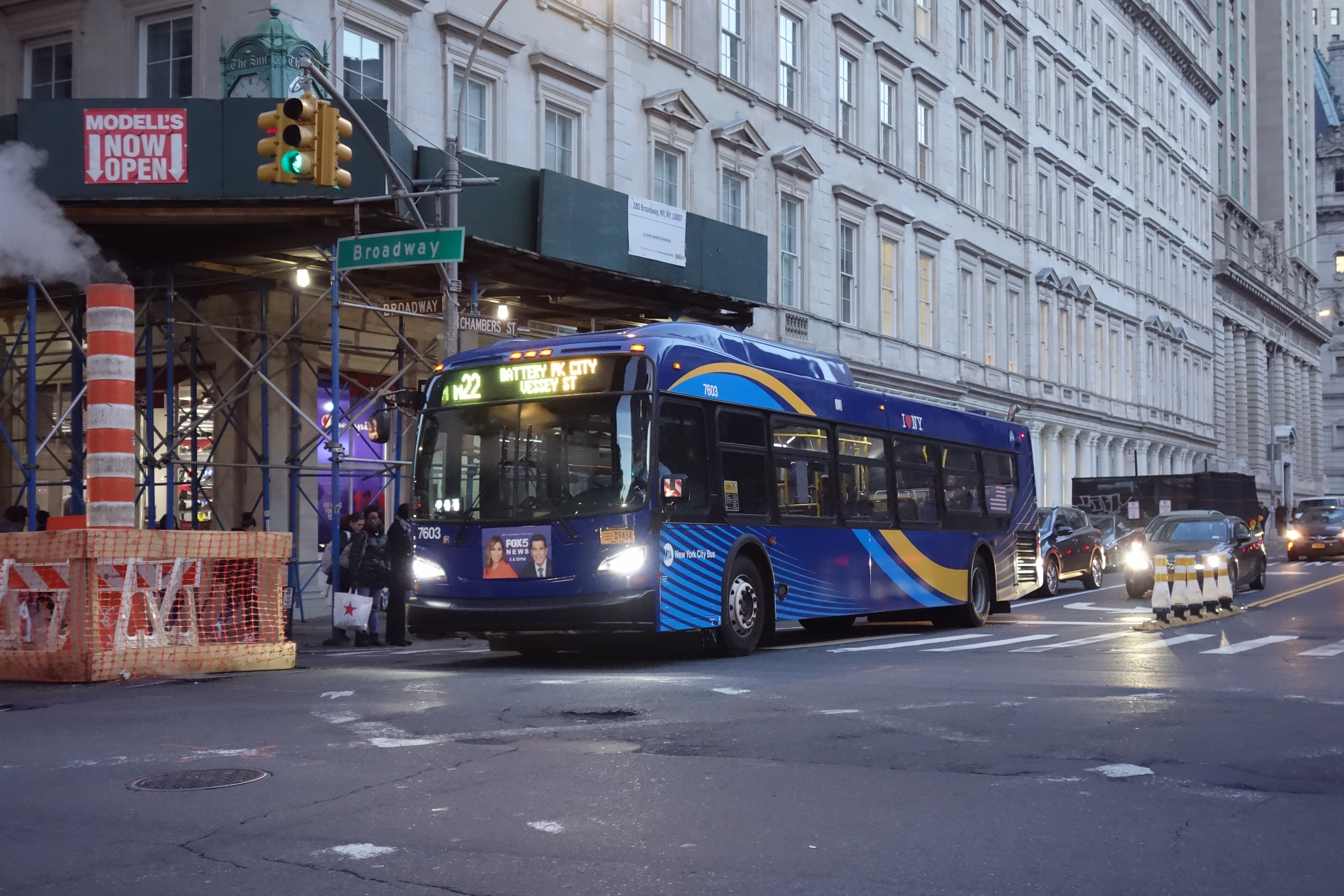
A 2019 New Flyer XD40 (7603) on the Battery Park City-bound M22 at Broadway/Chambers Street in November 2019

In the eastbound direction, the M22 bus starts at Vesey Street and North End Avenue in Battery Park City, travelling north along North End Avenue until it turns right onto Chambers Street. The M22 then turns right onto Broadway, and heads east along Park Row and south along Frankfort St. Buses continue northeast along Pearl St and St. James Place before turning east onto Madison Street. The M22 continues east along Madison Street until Madison Street merges with Grand Street and terminates at Grand Street and FDR Drive on the Lower East Side.

In the westbound direction, the M22 starts at Grand Street and FDR Drive on the Lower East Side, heading south along the FDR Drive, west along Cherry Street, north along Jackson Street, and west along Madison Street. The bus continues west along Madison Street until Pike Street, where it turns north and then turns west onto East Broadway. At Bowery, East Broadway becomes Worth Street, and the M22 turns south along Federal Plaza and Centre Street, then west onto Chambers St. The M22 then turns south onto North End Ave, east onto Murray Street, and south along West Street before turning west onto Vesey Street and terminating at Vesey Street and North End Ave in Battery Park City.

=== School trippers ===
When school is in session, one trip originates at M332 University Neighborhood Middle School at Madison/Montgomery Streets and departs at 2:44pm, heading west to terminate at Chambers/Greenwich Streets.

== History ==
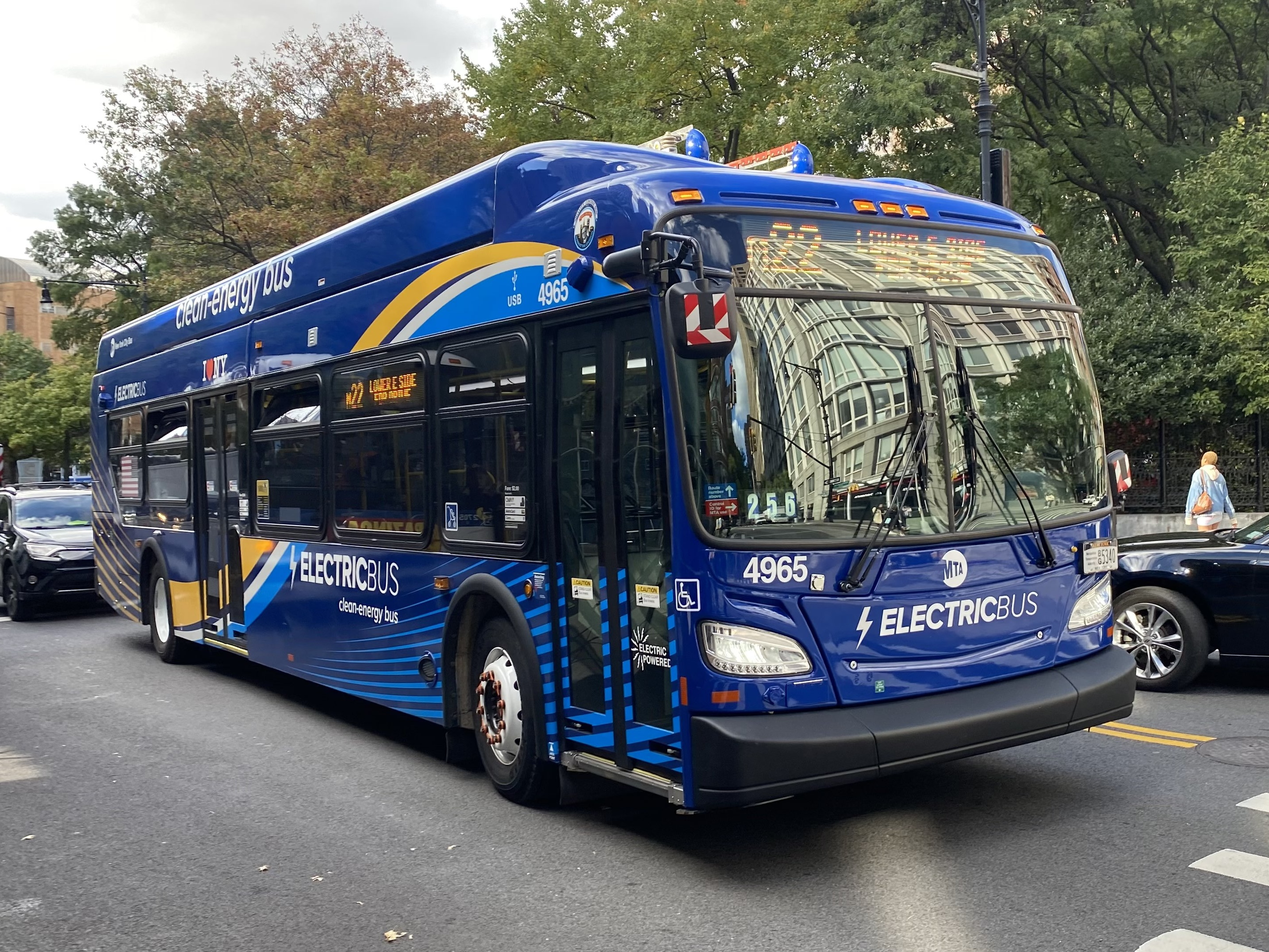
A 2023 XE40 (4965) on the Lower East Side-bound M22

On September 21, 1919, the New York Railways Company's Madison and Chambers Streets Line streetcar was replaced by the New York City Department of Plant and Structures' M1 bus route.

In 1933, this bus route was taken over by Green Bus Lines, which gave the route to the Comprehensive Omnibus Co. in 1935.

In 1948, the New York City government acquired all of the Comprehensive Omnibus Co. routes, including the M1.

This bus route was renumbered as the M22 on July 1, 1974. On June 27, 2010, overnight bus service on the M22 was discontinued due to a budget crisis.
