= Vladeck Houses =

Public housing development in Manhattan, New York

Coordinates: 40.7125°N 73.9817°W

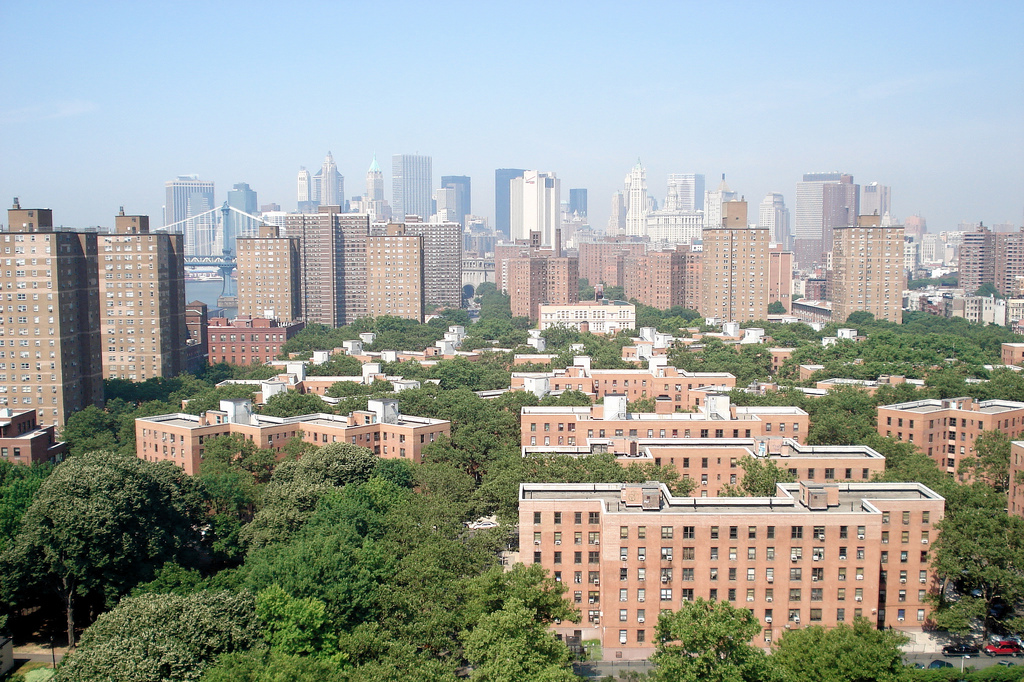
Vladeck Houses is the group of six-story buildings in the foreground.

Vladeck Houses is a public housing development built and maintained by the New York City Housing Authority on the Lower East Side of Manhattan.

== Background ==
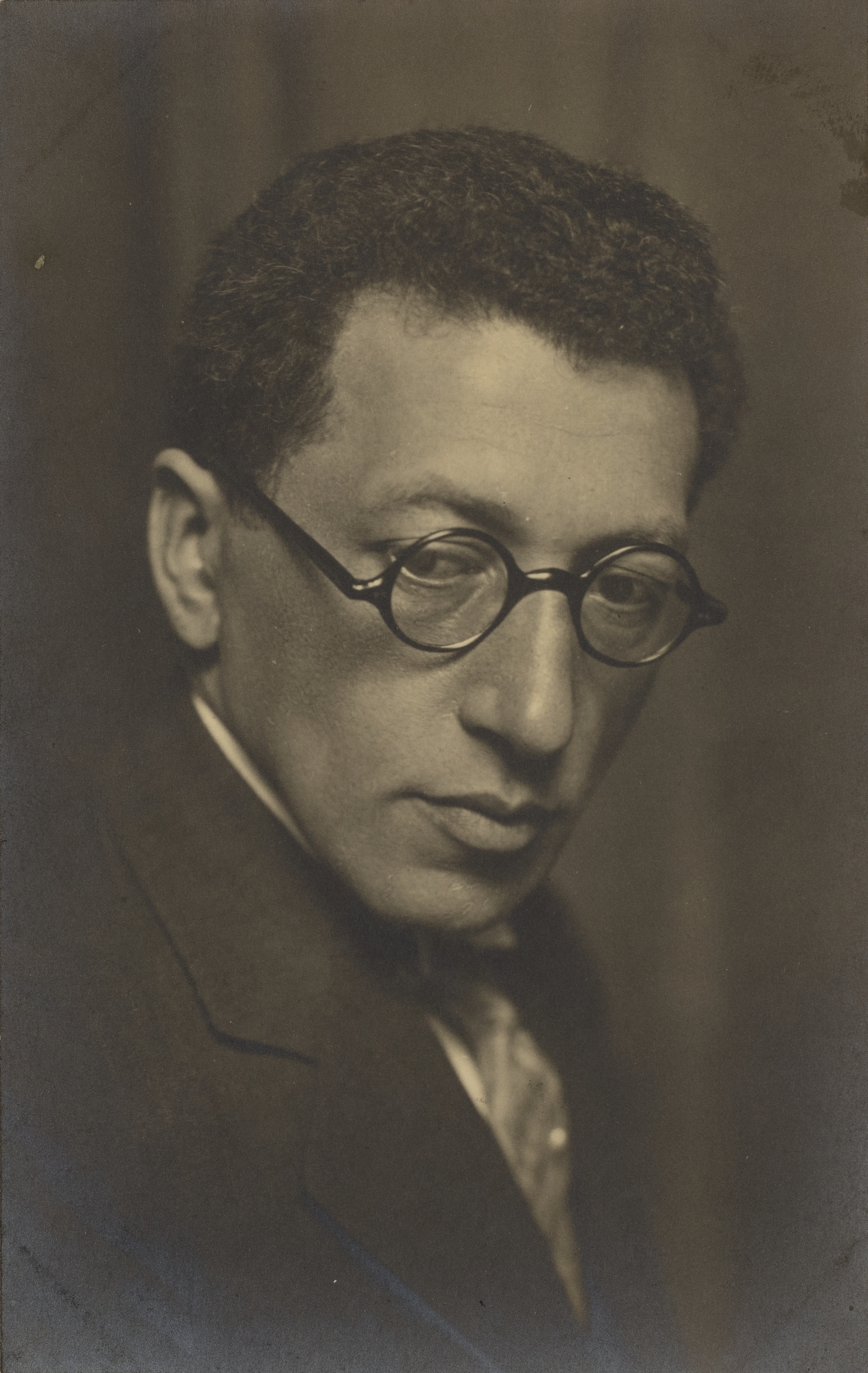
Vladeck in 1924

The development is named after Baruch Charney Vladeck (1886–1938), who was general manager of The Jewish Daily Forward, a Yiddish language newspaper, helped found the Jewish Labor Committee in 1934, served as its first president, and was a member of the original board of the New York City Housing Authority.

Baruch Charney Vladeck Houses is made up of 20 six-story buildings on 13 acres (5.3 ha), in which there are 1,523 apartments housing approximately 2,850 people. This complex is bordered by Madison Street to its north, Water Street to its south, Gouverneur Street to its west, and Jackson Street to its east. Construction began September 10, 1939, and was finished November 20, 1940.

Baruch Charney Vladeck II Houses consists of 4 six-story buildings on 2.23 acres (0.90 ha), in which there are 238 apartments housing approximately 445 people. This complex is bordered by Madison Street to its north, Cherry Street to its south, and Jackson Street to its west. Construction began September 10, 1939, and was finished October 25, 1940.

No one is currently serving as the Resident Association President for Vladeck Houses.

Since it is on the Lower East Side, Vladeck Houses is serviced by the New York Police Department's PSA 4 and is governed by Manhattan Community Board 3.
