= Madison Street (Manhattan) =

Street in Manhattan, New York

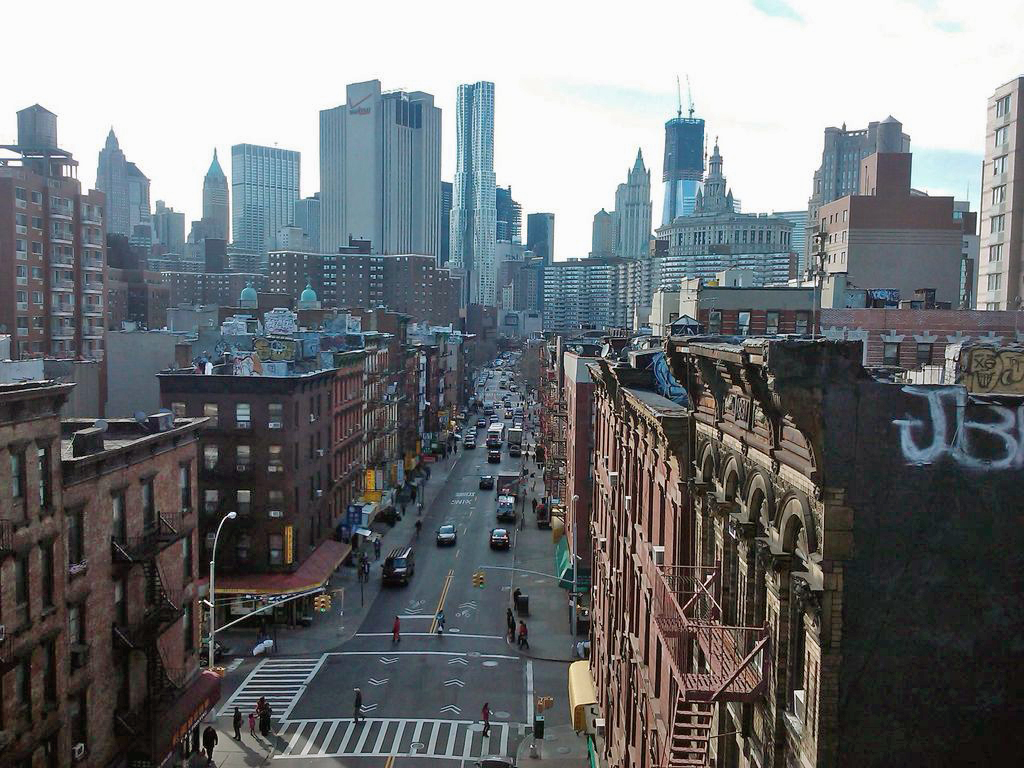
Madison Street as seen from Manhattan Bridge and the south

Madison Street is a two-way thoroughfare on the Lower East Side of the New York City borough of Manhattan that begins under the Brooklyn Bridge entrance ramp and ends at Grand Street. It is roughly sixteen large city blocks long. Due to security measures implemented after the September 11 attacks, public access to the part of the street before St. James Place is restricted.

The character of Madison Street changes from block to block. There are housing projects east of Pike Street. Between Catherine Street and Pike Street, the street is residential, dominated by mostly tenements. The street is considered one of the southern boundaries of Chinatown.

The Hamilton-Madison House at 50 Madison Street is a major provider of child care for the Chinatown, Two Bridges, and Lower East Side neighborhoods. Madison Street is surrounded by housing projects, tenements and schools. PS 1, PS 2, and the Corlears Complex schools all have yards facing the street. There is a medical facility with clinics and pharmacy facilities (Gouverneur Health Care Services) at 227 Madison Street.

== Transportation ==
The F and <F> trains stops at the East Broadway station, and there is an exit at Madison Street. The M22 bus runs eastbound on Madison Street from Grand Street to St. James Place, and westbound from Grand to Pike Streets. The M15 bus runs on Madison Street from Pike Street to St. James Place.
