= Two Bridges, Manhattan =

Two Bridges
- Neighborhood of Manhattan
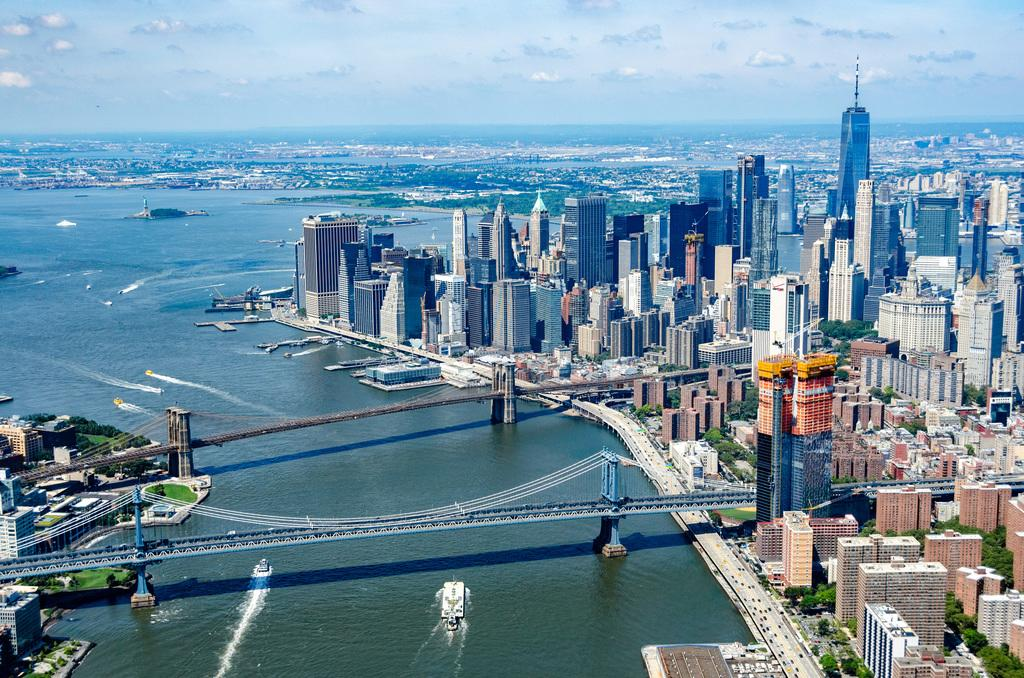
- Two Bridges neighborhood (right), seen from the East River in 2017
- Location in New York City
- Coordinates: 40.712°N 73.997°W
- Country: United States
- State: New York
- City: New York City
- Borough: Manhattan
- Community District: Manhattan 3

Area
  - Total: 0.26 sq mi (0.67 km^{2})

Population (2020)
  - Total: 29,129
  - Density: 110,000/sq mi (43,000/km^{2})
- Time zone: UTC−5 (Eastern)
  - Summer (DST): UTC−4 (EDT)
- ZIP Code: 10002
- Area codes: 212, 332, 646, and 917
- Two Bridges Historic District
- U.S. National Register of Historic Places
- U.S. Historic district
- Location within Lower Manhattan Location within New York City Location within New York
- Location: Roughly bounded by E. Broadway, Market St., Cherry St., Catherine St., Madison St., and St. James Place, New York, New York
- Area: 28 acres (11 ha)
- Architectural style: Early Republic, Mid 19th Century Revival
- NRHP reference No.: 03000845
- Added to NRHP: August 29, 2003

Two Bridges is a neighborhood in the New York City borough of Manhattan, lying at the southern end of the Lower East Side and Chinatown on the East River waterfront, near the footings of Brooklyn Bridge and of Manhattan Bridge. The neighborhood has been considered to be a part of the Lower East Side for much of its history. Two Bridges has traditionally been an immigrant neighborhood, previously populated by immigrants from Europe, and more recently from Latin America and China. The Two Bridges Historic District was listed in the National Register of Historic Places in September 2003.

Two Bridges has a mix of tenement-style walk-up buildings and high-rise buildings that include mixed-income and affordable housing developments as well as public housing provided by the New York City Housing Authority (NYCHA).

== Description ==
The Two Bridges neighborhood is bounded by the East River, East River Greenway, FDR Drive, and South Street to the south; East Broadway to the north; Montgomery Street to the east; and St. James Place, Pearl Street, and Brooklyn Bridge to the west. However, the Two Bridges Urban Renewal district lies between Manhattan Bridge and Williamsburg Bridge to the north. The neighborhood has two sections: the area between the Brooklyn Bridge and Manhattan Bridge that borders Chinatown, and an area to the east of the Manhattan Bridge that borders the Lower East Side. To the west of the Two Bridges neighborhood is the Civic Center and the Financial District.

In 2013, real estate developer Extell headed by Gary Barnett acquired a former Pathmark grocery store site at 227 Cherry Street east of the Manhattan Bridge. In 2014, Extell announced that it would build a 68-story market-rate condo tower and a separate 13-story affordable development on the site.

The HBO series Flight of the Conchords was based in the Two Bridges neighborhood.

While Democratic candidate Kamala Harris carried New York City's Borough of Manhattan in the 2024 presidential election, a lone precinct in Two Bridges, consisting entirely of the western part of Knickerbocker Village, went for her Republican opponent, Donald Trump, by a 16 vote margin out of roughly 500 votes cast. The result marked Trump's sole precinct victory in Manhattan out of any of his three presidential runs.

=== Etymology ===
One of the first uses of the term to describe the area was employed by the naming of the Two Bridges Neighborhood Council in 1955.

=== Two Bridges Historic District ===
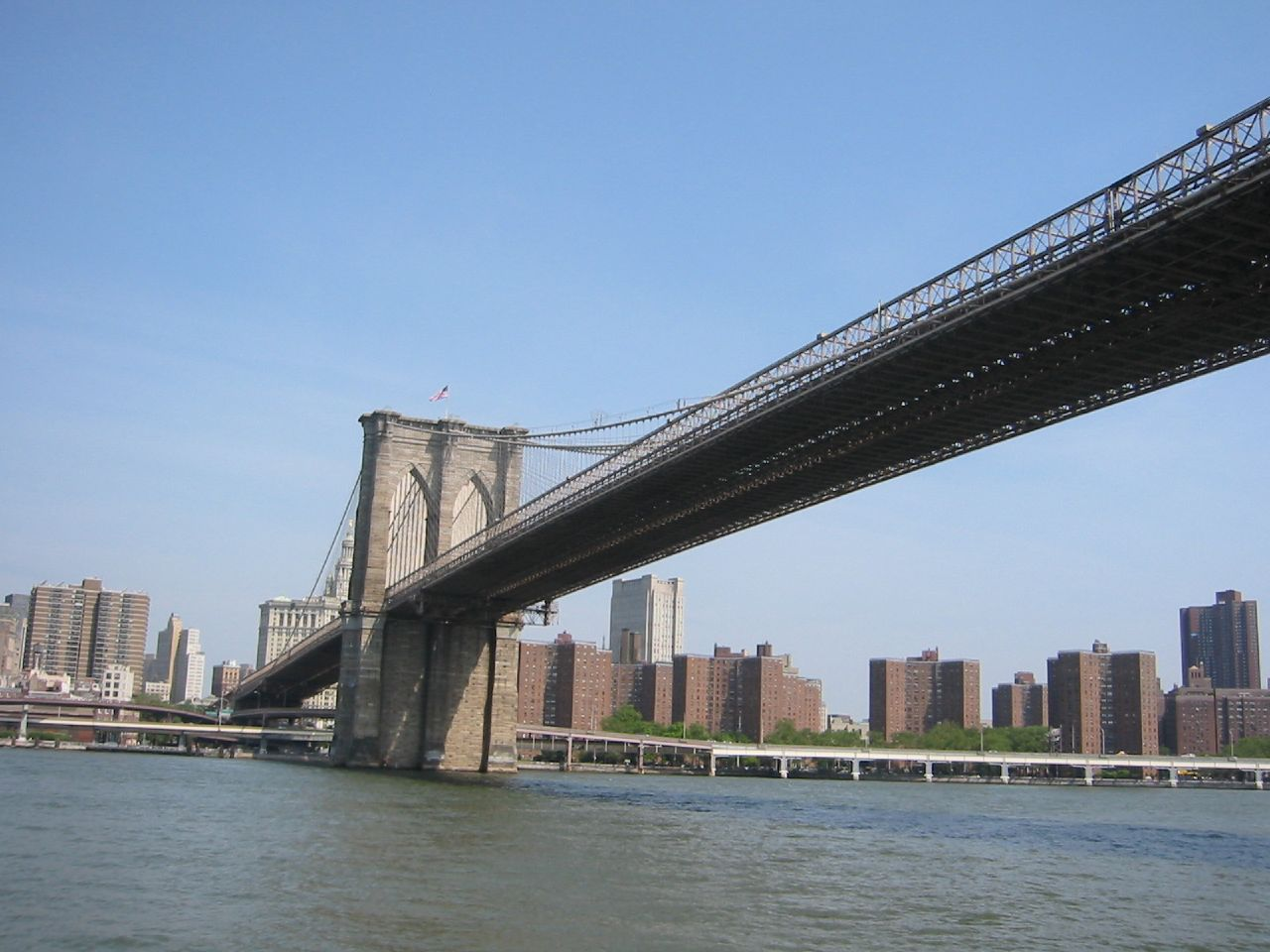
Brooklyn Bridge and housing projects in Two Bridges

In September 2003, the Two Bridges Historic District was listed in the National Register of Historic Places. The district is a nine-block area, roughly bounded by East Broadway, Market Street, Cherry Street, Catherine Street, Madison Street, and St. James Place.

The district includes the following landmarks on state and federal historic registers:

- First Cemetery of Congregation Shearith Israel
- Knickerbocker Village housing development
- Mariners Temple
- The Sea and Land Church
- St. James Church
- William and Rosamond Clark House
- Alfred E. Smith House (in which New York Governor Al Smith was born)

=== Earlier ethnic populations ===
For much of the 20th century, the area was mainly populated by European immigrants such as Jewish, Italian, Irish, and Greeks. Later on, an influx of Latin American immigrants also settled into the area especially from Puerto Rico. Starting in the 1960s, an influx of Chinese immigrants mainly Cantonese speaking coming from Hong Kong and Guangdong province began flooding into the nearby Chinatown neighborhood, but eventually as it could not accommodate their continuing growing influx, many of them began settling and overlapping into the Two Bridges area. Significant numbers of Vietnamese people and Burmese Chinese also settled in the area. The neighborhood became more racially and culturally diverse. Some significant numbers of Fuzhou dialect speakers also settled into the neighborhood by the early 1980s, but eventually by the late 1980s and through 1990s, their growing population eventually grew to become the largest population of the area, creating their own Fuzhou Chinatown distinct from the original Cantonese Chinatown from The Bowery going west.

=== Current ethnic populations ===
Despite the Fuzhou speaking residents becoming the largest population of Two Bridges, there are still significant pockets of long-time Cantonese, Jewish, and Puerto Rican residents remaining especially in certain housing developments with the Co-ops such as Cooperative Village still having a significant community of Jewish residents and NYCHA public housing developments such as Alfred E. Smith House, Rutgers Houses, LaGuardia Houses, and Vladeck Houses including other subsidized housing programs being primarily populated by Puerto Rican, Cantonese, and African Americans residents, though some Fuzhou residents have also moved into these developments as well; however, some tenement buildings in the area also still have some significant amounts of Puerto Rican and Cantonese residents.

=== Little Fuzhou ===
Little Fuzhou (小福州, 紐約華埠), or Fuzhou Town (福州埠), a prime destination for immigrants from the Fujian Province of China, is centered on the street of East Broadway in Two Bridges. During the 1980s an influx of Fuzhou immigrants flooded East Broadway, and a Little Fuzhou enclave evolved on the street. With a large Fuzhou population, East Broadway is often referred to as Little Fuzhou by Fuzhou immigrants.

The Fuzhou immigrants often speak Mandarin along with their Fuzhou dialect. The Fuzhou immigrants were the only major non-Cantonese Chinese group to largely settle in Manhattan's Chinatown. This is due to the Mandarin-speaking enclaves being too expensive for Fuzhouese, and since many Fuzhou immigrants came without immigration paperwork and were forced into low paying jobs.

A considerable number of Fujianese clan associations can be found in and around the street, many of which are even specified by clans from certain villages of Fuzhou region. For example, the members of "Fujian Fuqi Association" are from Fuqi Village, Changle County, Fuzhou, Fujian Province. The Fukien American Association is also located here. Restaurants, markets and intercity bus lines run by Foochowese concentrate in East Broadway. A statue of Lin Zexu, who was also a Fuzhouese, was erected in Chatham Square in 1997.

However, since the 2000s and especially since the 2010s, there has been rapid gentrification in the area, which is now causing the Fuzhou-speaking enclave to decline in favor of an increasing population of wealthier white professionals moving into the area. Meanwhile, another satellite Fuzhou community has emerged in Brooklyn's Sunset Park and is currently continuing to grow rapidly far surpassing the original Fuzhou-speaking enclave here in Two Bridges as well as overwhelmingly marginalizing the Fuzhou enclave in Two Bridges as the primary center of Fuzhou culture and settlement for the new incoming Fuzhou immigrants.

=== Gentrification ===
Since the 2000s, gentrification has hit the area with rising property values and rent prices, which have been slowly pushing out the working-class populations as well as communities of Chinese-speaking immigrants (including Fuzhou-speaking immigrants). Hispanic residents and other non-white populations are now undergoing rapid decline to an increasing population of wealthier white professionals.

== Demographics ==
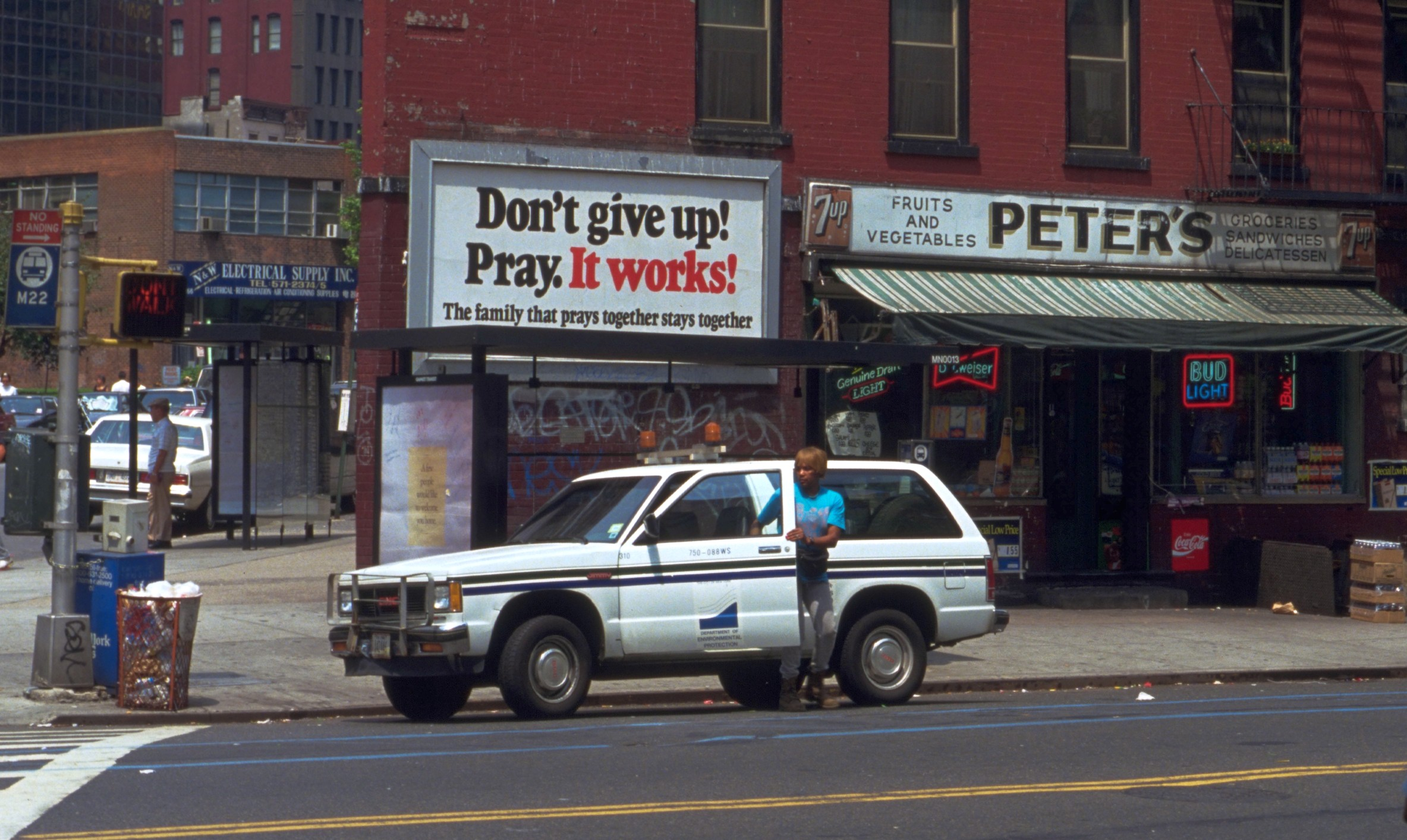
Madison Street in Two Bridges in 1991

Two Bridges was historically an Irish and Italian neighborhood, but after the war and the building of public housing high-rises in the 1950s, black and Hispanic residents moved into the area. More recently, Two Bridges has been populated by first- and second-generation Chinese immigrants. The short-lived Two Bridges Model School District was established in 1967 as an experiment in local control of school districts in a neighborhood that was at the time "35% Chinese and Chinese American, 40% Puerto Rican, 12% white and 12% African American". The area remains a home to low- to moderate-income families and maintains a reputation for being gritty. Guns N' Roses guitarist and area resident Richard Fortus called Two Bridges "the only neighborhood left in Manhattan that doesn’t have a Starbucks".

== See also ==
- National Register of Historic Places listings in Manhattan below 14th Street
