= Mei Lum =

American artist

Mei Lum is a Chinese American artist, activist, and entrepreneur in New York City. She is the owner of the Wing On Wo & Co., the oldest continuously operating store in Manhattan's Chinatown. Lum is an artist and activist working to preserve Chinatown's cultural heritage via the W.O.W. Project.

== Background and education ==
Lum was born in New York City. She received her B.A. from Mount Holyoke College in East Asian Studies in 2012. She also studied at Tsinghua University from 2010 to 2011. After graduation, she was awarded the Princeton in Asia fellowship. She applied to Columbia University's program in international relations, but ultimately chose to focus on her family business instead of pursuing graduate work.

== Wing on Wo & Co. ==
Lum is the fifth generation owner and operator of Wing on Wo & Co., a porcelain business on Mott St. in New York City. The store was founded in 1890 and sold porcelain and imported goods that appealed to the Chinese immigrant community. The shop operated as a credit union and informal post office before the Cultural Revolution made Chinese goods accessible in the United States.

The COVID-19 pandemic forced the company to transition to e-commerce, and to move promotion for the store to social media platforms. The store serves as a community center and a hub for the W.O.W. Project.

== W.O.W. Project ==
Lum is the founder of the W.O.W Project, an organization that seeks to create a bridge between many communities regardless of culture, generation, or location. She is an executive director in many of the W.O.W Project's undertakings such as the preservation of Manhattan's Chinatown and other similar communities. She has been vocal about the threat that gentrification poses to Chinatowns around the country. She seeks to achieve these goals through art and activism. The Project is primarily women, queer, and trans-led.

W.O.W. promotes and supports artists, especially in ceramics. Lum spoke with ceramicist, Stephanie H. Shih about her exhibit with the American Museum of Ceramic Art in 2020.

== Artist ==
Lum was Civic Practice Partnership Artist in Residence at the Metropolitan Museum of Art in New York from 2020 to 2022. As part of this residency in August 2022, she organized Infinite Beginnings, an event hosted at Columbus Park in Chinatown. The event featured an interactive thangka in collaboration with artists Singha Hon and K-Ming Chang.

== Awards and recognition ==
Lum was recognized as a 2017 emerging voice in the Asian and Pacific American community by NBC Asian America. She received the 2019 Community Builder Award from OCA Asian Pacific American Advocates and the 2020 Rubinger Community Fellowship from the Local Initiatives Support Corporation. Lum was recognized by Cole Haan as part of the brand's innovators series.
