= Confucius Plaza =

Apartment building in Manhattan, New York

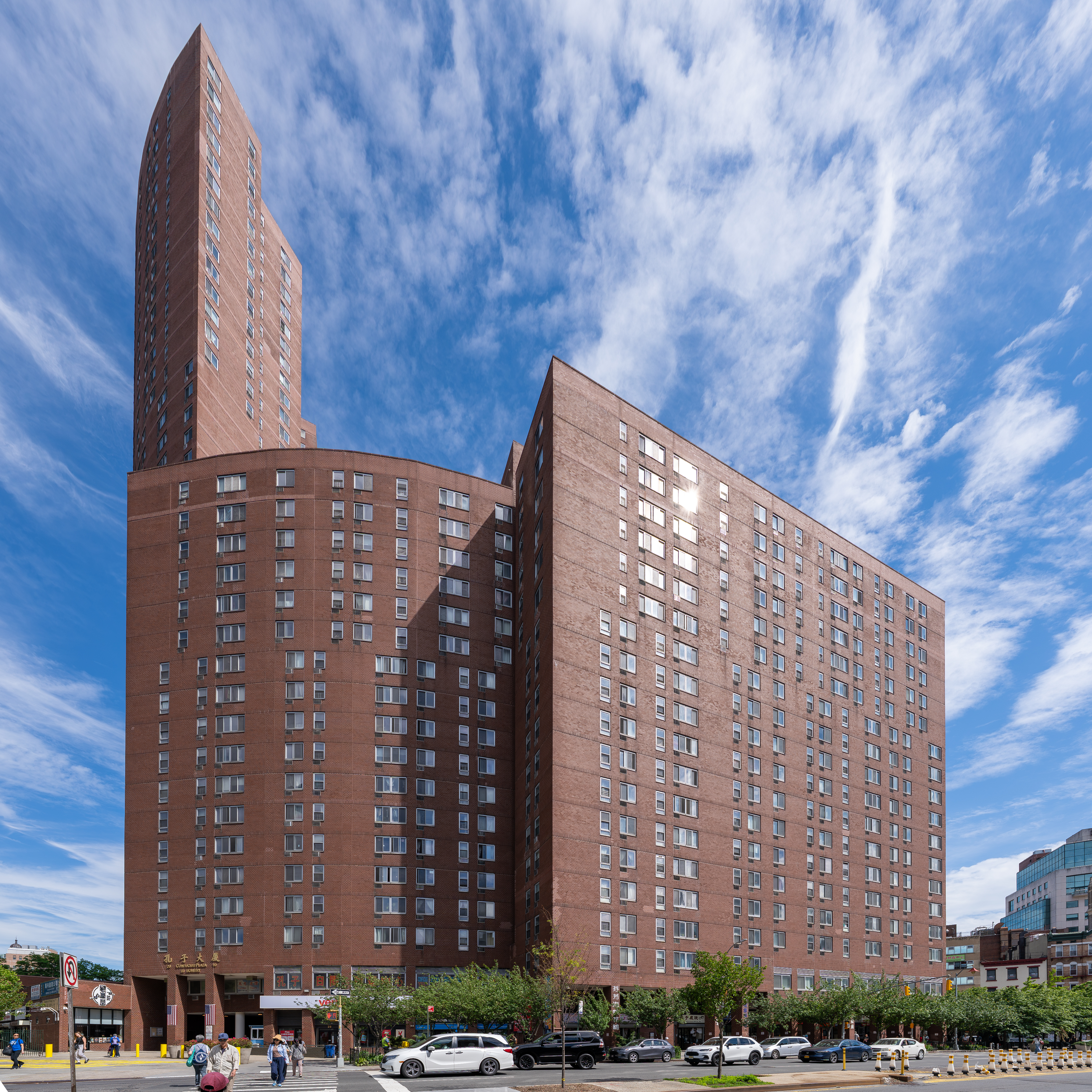

General information
- Type: Government Subsidized Residential Co-op Apartments
- Location: Chinatown, Manhattan, New York
- Coordinates: 40°42′53″N 73°59′46″W
- Completed: 1975
- Opening: December 1975
- Cost: US$38.387 million
- Operator: Mitchell-Lama Housing Program

Height
- Roof: 433 feet (132 m)

Technical details
- Floor count: 44

Design and construction
- Architects: Horowitz & Chun
- Structural engineer: Rosenwasser / Grossman
- Main contractor: DeMatteis Organizations

Chinese name
- Traditional Chinese: 孔子廣場
- Simplified Chinese: 孔子广场
Transcriptions
Standard Mandarin
- Hanyu Pinyin: kǒng zǐ guǎng chǎng
Yue: Cantonese
- Jyutping: hung2 zi2 gwong2 coeng4
- Confucius Plaza
- U.S. Historic district – Contributing property
- Location within Manhattan Location within New York City Location within New York Location within the United States
- Part of: The Bowery Historic District (ID13000027)
- Designated CP: February 20, 2013

Confucius Plaza Apartments is a limited-equity housing cooperative in Chinatown, Manhattan, New York City built as an affordable housing development under the Mitchell–Lama Housing Program. The 44-story brown brick tower block complex (433 ft (132 m)) with 762 apartments was constructed in 1975 at a cost of $38.387 million. The building was the first major public-funded housing project built for almost exclusively Chinese Americans.

The Yung Wing Public School, P.S. 124 (K–5), shops, community space, and a daycare center are located beneath the apartments. The complex is located north of Chatham Square at the intersection of Bowery, Doyers Street, and Division Street.

== History and Development ==
The idea to introduce this complex was by Kumshui Stephen Law and Allan Eng-Achson whom were local businessmen and with other supportive leaders obtained a contract with Mitchell Lama to build this affordable housing development. Unlike many of the Mitchell Lama developments in the city, this one resembles very much like the Hong Kong Public Housing Developments with their very tall structures, a public school within, a lot of concentrated retail businesses within two floor levels, and a pedestrian arcade walkway. When they were first built, there were initially criticisms on why there was no Asian style designs on the structure to reflect the cultural community, however the president of Association for Chinatown Housing defended that the residents should be able to live comfortably in their residences and not for tourists to look at.

=== Protests To Increase More Asian Construction Workers ===
During the construction of Confucius Plaza, Asian American activists organized several successful protests alleging discriminatory hiring practices by the contractor, DeMatteis Organization, for refusing to hire Asian construction workers. On May 16, 1974, a protest of 250 individuals organized by Asian Americans for Equal Employment (now Asian Americans for Equality) resulted in a work stoppage when protestors entered the construction site. Protestors held signs in English and Chinese which stated "The Asians build the railroad; Why not Confucius Plaza" and "DeMatteis, you are big racist." Over 55 people were arrested for trespassing and disorderly conduct. Several weeks later, DeMatteis agreed to hire 27 minority workers.

== Completion ==
When the housing development was first completed in the mid 1970s, the purchase price of the apartments were going for $2000 to $3000 with the carrying charges being around $200 - $300. Before construction was completed, all the apartments had been sold as indicated from a 1978 documentary "Chinatown, Inc.". The reporter Linda Shin in this documentary had commented 85% of family households were Chinese.

=== Initial Hesitancy From Some Local Residents ===
In a 2025 short documentary, "The Superintendent | Chinatown Sequences", the complex's superintendent Thomas Lou (whose family was one of the complex's first residents) reflects on how many local residents initially hesitated to apply for this development despite the upgraded modernized amenities and space than the district's overwhelmingly existing tenements during the 1970s due to the fact their rent-regulated tenement apartments despite overcrowded substandard conditions at the time were relatively more affordable than the starting average rent prices for this housing development.

== Cultural Landmark ==
Statue of Confucius by Liu Shih

One of the most frequently visited landmarks in Chinatown is the 15-foot (4.6 m) bronze statue of Confucius, the Chinese philosopher, in front of the complex. Sculpted by Liu Shih, the statue was presented by the Chinese Consolidated Benevolent Association as a token of appreciation, and to commemorate the U.S. bicentennial. At its base, a Confucian proverb is inscribed aside an American Flag, praising a just government with remarkable leaders of wisdom and ability.

== Neighborhood Gentrification ==
Over the years, Manhattan's Chinatown and its neighboring Two Bridges/Lower East Side along with the whole Lower Manhattan areas became immensely encroached by gentrification. Attempts to seek private market affordable rent stabilized apartments catered to low income residents in these districts once easily accessible until the 1990s became virtually obsolete since the 2000s. Since then, the newly advertised private market rate apartments in these districts have been at astronomical luxurious prices almost none are rent regulated. The remaining but declining numbers of long time rent stabilized tenement residents in the area are now increasingly often rent burdened despite regulated rent increases with continuously deteriorating housing conditions; upon vacancy of these tenement units, in virtually every instance they are converted into non-rent regulated luxurious market rate apartments.

=== Affordable Housing's Resilience Against Gentrification ===
Although there were early skepticism of Confucius Plaza from the local residents in the 1970s, but because of later factors of gentrification and other changing conditions in the area, Confucius Plaza in the center of Manhattan's Chinatown along with other Mitchell Lama, NYCHA and other non-profit housing developments in neighboring Two Bridges/Lower East Side became the most highly-sought-out affordable housing developments within these districts now serving as the area's final but isolated bastions of true affordable housing for the lower income and working to middle class residents while their adjacent surrounding communities are increasingly getting an influx of luxuriously wealthier residents either in newly built luxury buildings or in tenement-converted-luxury-apartments. These other affordable housing developments in the district also have over the years absorbed a large population of Chinese residents as well in addition to Confucius Plaza and because of this, they are one of the significant contributors to maintaining the Chinese community and businesses against total disappearance despite gentrification factors.

To date, the purchase costs and carrying charges at Confucius Plaza have remained very low.

A section of Second Avenue Subway tunnel was built in the 1970s, constructed concurrently with the plaza underneath it, and is lightly graffitied.
