= Chinatown, Manhattan =

Neighborhood in New York City, USA

Chinatown, Manhattan 曼哈頓華埠 / 曼哈頓唐人街 (Chinese)
- Neighborhood
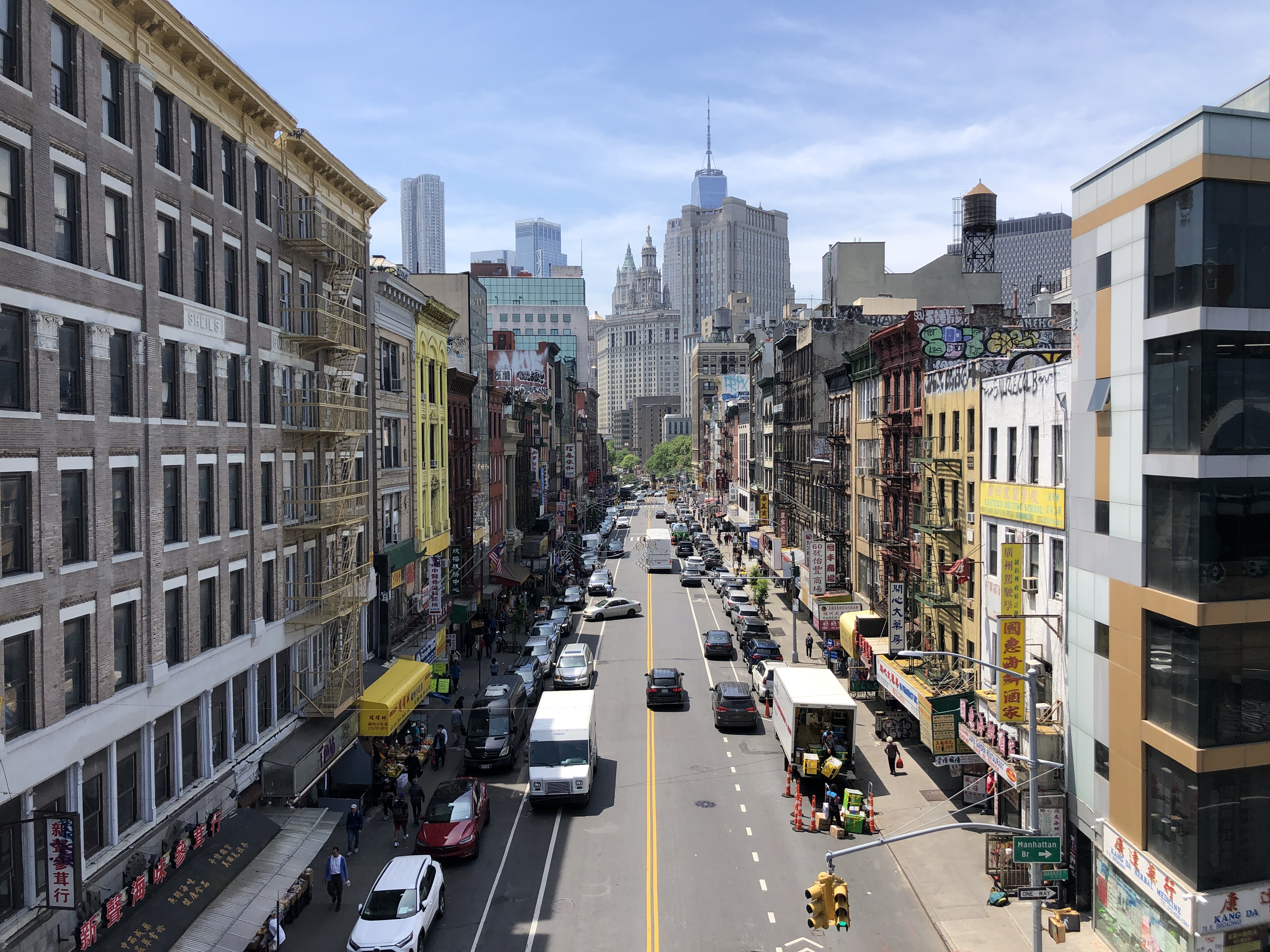
- View west along East Broadway from the Manhattan Bridge in 2024
- Interactive map of Chinatown, Manhattan
- Coordinates: 40.715°N 73.997°W
- Country: United States
- State: New York
- City: New York City
- Borough: Manhattan
- Community District: Manhattan 3

Area
  - Total: 0.768 sq mi (1.99 km^{2})

Population (2010)
  - Total: 47,844
  - Density: 62,300/sq mi (24,100/km^{2})

Ethnicity
  - Asian: 63.9%
  - White: 16.3%
  - Hispanic: 13.4%
  - Black: 4.8%
  - Other: 1.6%

Economics
  - Median income: $68,657
- Time zone: UTC−5 (Eastern)
  - Summer (DST): UTC−4 (EDT)
- ZIP Codes: 10002, 10013
- Area code: 212, 332, 646, and 917

Chinese name
- Traditional Chinese: 曼哈頓華埠
- Simplified Chinese: 曼哈顿华埠
Transcriptions
Standard Mandarin
- Hanyu Pinyin: Mànhādùn Huábù
- Bopomofo: ㄇㄢˋ ㄏㄚ ㄉㄨㄣˋ ㄏㄨㄚˊ ㄅㄨˋ
- Wade–Giles: Man^{4}-ha^{1}-tun^{4} hua^{2} pu^{4}
- IPA: [mân.xá.twə̂n xwǎ.pû]
Hakka
- Romanization: Man ha dunˋ faˇ pu
Yue: Cantonese
- Yale Romanization: Maahn hā deuhn Wā bouh
- Jyutping: Maan6 haa1 deon6 waa1 bou6
- IPA: [man˨.ha˥.tɵn˨ wa˥.pɔw˨]
Eastern Min
- Fuzhou BUC: Man-ha-tún huà-pú

Alternative Chinese name
- Traditional Chinese: 曼哈頓唐人街
- Simplified Chinese: 曼哈顿唐人街
Transcriptions
Standard Mandarin
- Hanyu Pinyin: Mànhādùn Tángrénjiē
- Bopomofo: ㄇㄢˋ ㄏㄚ ㄉㄨㄣˋ ㄊㄤˊ ㄖㄣˊ ㄐㄧㄝ
- Wade–Giles: Man^{4}-ha^{1}-tun^{4} t'ang^{2} jen^{2} chieh^{1}
- IPA: [mân.xá.twə̂n tʰǎŋ.ɻə̌n.tɕjé]
Hakka
- Romanization: Man ha dunˋ tongˇ nginˇ gieˊ
Yue: Cantonese
- Yale Romanization: Maahn hā deuhn Tòhng yàhn gāai
- Jyutping: Maan6 haa1 deon6 tong4 jan4 gaai1
- IPA: [man˨.ha˥.tɵn˨ tʰɔŋ˩.jɐn˩.kaj˥]
- Chinatown and Little Italy Historic District
- U.S. National Register of Historic Places
- U.S. Historic district
- NRHP reference No.: 10000012
- Added to NRHP: February 12, 2010

Manhattan's Chinatown (Note: simplified Chinese: 曼哈顿华埠 / 曼哈顿唐人街; traditional Chinese: 曼哈頓華埠 / 曼哈頓唐人街; pinyin: Mànhādùn huábù / Mànhādùn tángrénjiē; Jyutping: Maan6 haa1 deon6 waa1 bou6 / Maan6 haa1 deon6 tong4 jan4 gaai1) is a neighborhood of Lower Manhattan in New York City, bounded by the Lower East Side to its east, Little Italy to its north, Civic Center to its south, and Tribeca to its west. With an estimated population of 90,000 to 100,000 people, Chinatown is home to the highest concentration of Chinese people in the Western Hemisphere. Manhattan's Chinatown is also one of the oldest Chinese ethnic enclaves. The Manhattan Chinatown is one of nine Chinatown neighborhoods in New York City, as well as one of twelve in the New York metropolitan area, which contains the largest ethnic Chinese population outside Asia, comprising an estimated 924,619 uniracial individuals in 2024.

Chinatown is also a densely populated neighborhood, with over 141,000 residents living in its vicinity encompassing 1.7 square miles, "of which 28.1% identified as Asian" in 2023. Historically, Chinatown was primarily populated by Cantonese speakers. However, in the 1980s and 1990s, large numbers of Fuzhounese-speaking immigrants also arrived and formed a sub-neighborhood annexed to the eastern portion of Chinatown east of The Bowery, which has become known as Little Fuzhou subdivided away from the primarily Cantonese populated original longtime established Chinatown of Manhattan from the proximity of The Bowery going west, known as Little Hong Kong/Guangdong. As many Fuzhounese and Cantonese speakers now speak Mandarin—the official language in Mainland China and Taiwan—in addition to their native languages, this has made it more important for Chinatown residents to learn and speak Mandarin. Although now overtaken in size by the rapidly growing Flushing Chinatown (located in the New York City borough of Queens) and Brooklyn Chinatown, the Manhattan Chinatown remains a dominant cultural force for the Chinese diaspora, as home to the Museum of Chinese in America and as the headquarters of numerous publications based both in the U.S. and China that are geared to overseas Chinese.

Chinatown is part of Manhattan Community District 3, and its primary ZIP Codes are 10013 and 10002. It is patrolled by the 5th Precinct of the New York City Police Department.

== Location ==
Although a New York Business Improvement District has been identified for support, Chinatown has no officially defined borders. The following streets are commonly considered the approximate borders:

- Canal Street or Hester Street to the north, bordering or overlapping Little Italy
- Worth Street to the southwest, bordering Civic Center
- East Broadway to the southeast, bordering Two Bridges
- Essex Street to the east, bordering or overlapping the Lower East Side
- Lafayette Street to the west, bordering Tribeca

The historic core of Chinatown is bounded by Chatham Square/Bowery, Worth, Baxter, and Canal. Mott (south of Canal), Mulberry, Bayard, Pell, Doyers, and Worth were settled by Chinese immigrants starting in the 1870s. The local branch of the Chinese Consolidated Benevolent Association was founded at 10 Chatham Square in 1883 and later moved to the building at 16 Mott Street, now considered the "City Hall of Chinatown".

| Region | Detailed places |
|---|---|
| Boundary approximations | Selected locations in Chinatown, Manhattan: Points of interest; Parks and open spaces; Transit; 1 Pearl River Mart; 2 Canal Street station 3 Museum of Chinese in America; 4 Columbus Park / Dr. Sun Yat-sen Plaza; 5 Mott & Pell (Little Hong Kong); 6 Church of the Transfiguration; 7 Chatham Square / Kimlau Square; 8 Confucius Plaza; 9 Grand Street station 10 East Broadway station 11 Little Fuzhou |

== Citywide demographics ==
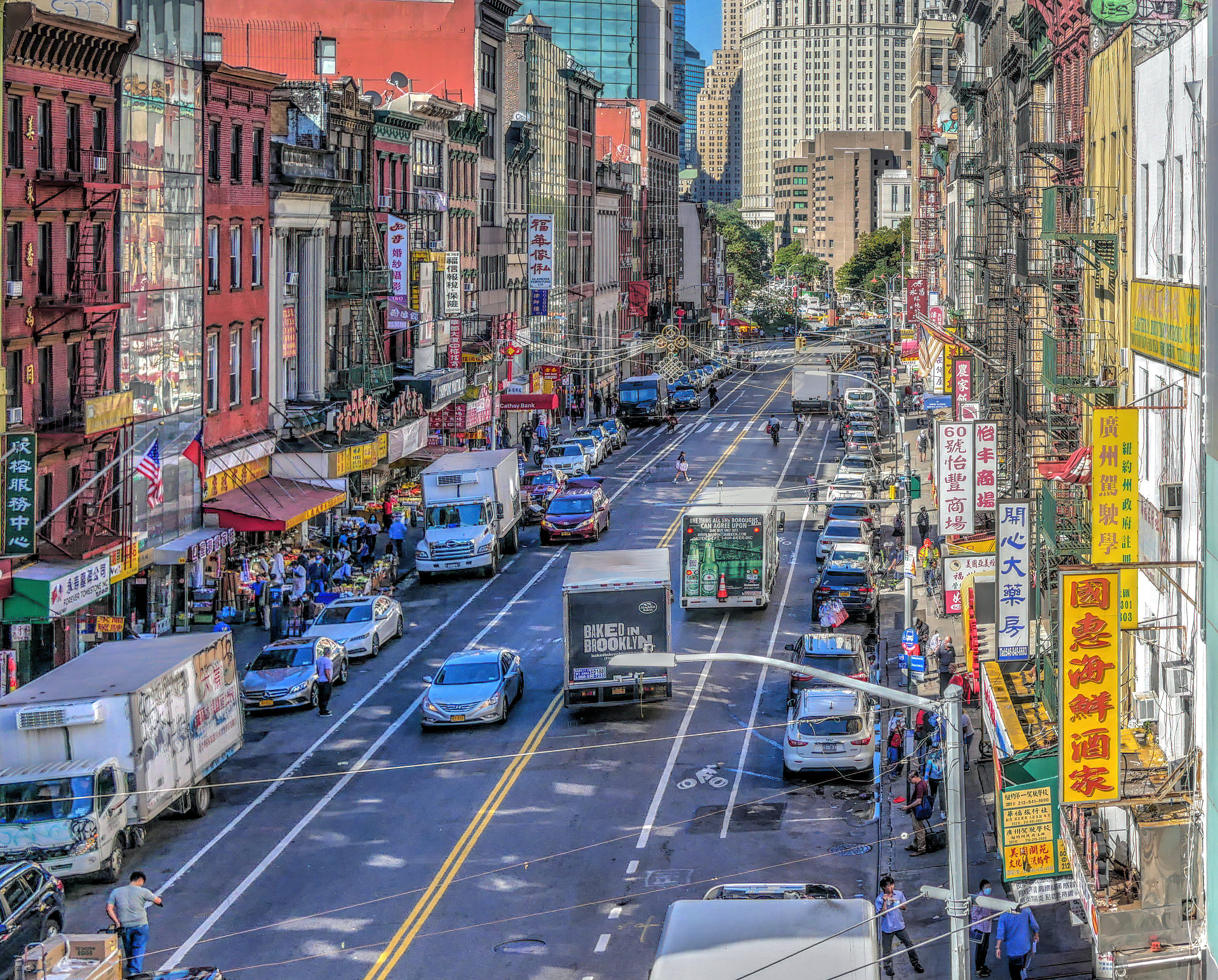
Little Fuzhou (on East Broadway) is seen from the Manhattan Bridge.

The Manhattan Chinatown is one of nine Chinatown neighborhoods in New York City, as well as one of twelve in the New York metropolitan area, which contains the largest ethnic Chinese population outside Asia, enumerating an estimated 779,269 individuals as of 2013; the remaining Chinatowns are located in the boroughs of Queens (up to four, depending upon definition) and Brooklyn (three) and in Nassau County, all on Long Island in New York State; as well as in Edison and Parsippany-Troy Hills in New Jersey. In addition, Manhattan's Little Fuzhou, an enclave populated primarily by more recent Chinese immigrants from the Fujian of China, is technically considered a part of Manhattan's Chinatown, albeit now developing a separate identity of its own.

A new and rapidly growing Chinese community in East Harlem, Uptown Manhattan, nearly tripled in population between the years 2000 and 2010, according to U.S. Census figures. This neighborhood has been described as the precursor to a new satellite Chinatown within Manhattan itself, which upon acknowledged formation would represent the second Chinese neighborhood in Manhattan, the tenth large Chinese settlement in New York City, and the twelfth within the overall New York City metropolitan region.

As the city proper with the largest ethnic Chinese population outside Asia by a wide margin, estimated at 628,763 as of 2017, and as the primary destination for new Chinese immigrants, New York City is subdivided into official municipal boroughs, which themselves are home to significant Chinese populations, with Brooklyn and Queens, adjacently located on Long Island, leading the fastest growth. After the City of New York itself, the boroughs of Queens and Brooklyn encompass the largest Chinese populations, respectively, of all municipalities in the United States.

Chinese Americans in New York City
| borough | Chinese Americans residents | |
| borough | percent | number |
|---|---|---|
| Queens | 10.2 | 265,135 |
| Brooklyn | 7.9 | 222,059 |
| Manhattan | 6.6 | 119,208 |
| Staten Island | 2.9 | 27,707 |
| The Bronx | 0.5 | 7,859 |
| New York City | | 573,388 |

== History ==
=== Ah Ken and early Chinese immigration ===
Historical population
| Census | Pop. | Note | %± |
|---|---|---|---|
| 1990 | 51,439 | | — |
| 2000 | 59,320 | | 15.3% |
| 2010 | 52,613 | | −11.3% |
Asian American population

Ah Ken is claimed to have arrived in the area during the 1850s; he is the first Chinese person credited as having permanently immigrated to Chinatown. As a Cantonese businessman, Ah Ken eventually founded a successful cigar store on Park Row. He first arrived around 1858 in New York City, where he was "probably one of those Chinese mentioned in gossip of the sixties [1860s] as peddling 'awful' cigars at three cents apiece from little stands along the City Hall park fence – offering a paper spill and a tiny oil lamp as a lighter", according to author Alvin Harlow in Old Bowery Days: The Chronicles of a Famous Street (1931).

In the 1850s, the California Gold Rush brought a wave of Chinese immigration to the United States. Approximately 25,000 Chinese immigrants left their homes in search for gam saan ("gold mountain") in California. In New York, immigrants found work as "cigar men" or carrying billboards, and Ah Ken's particular success encouraged cigar makers William Longford, John Occoo, and John Ava to also ply their trade in Chinatown, eventually forming a monopoly on the cigar trade. It has been speculated that it may have been Ah Ken who kept a small boarding house on lower Mott Street and rented out bunks to the first Chinese immigrants to arrive in Chinatown. It was with the profits he earned as a landlord, earning an average of $100 per month, that he was able to open his Park Row smoke shop around which modern-day Chinatown would grow.

=== Chinese exclusion period ===
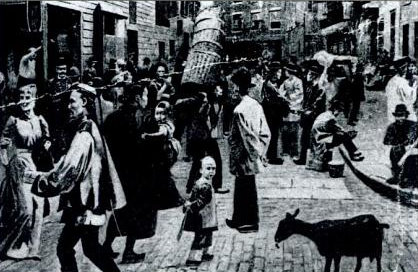
Doyers Street in an 1898 postcard

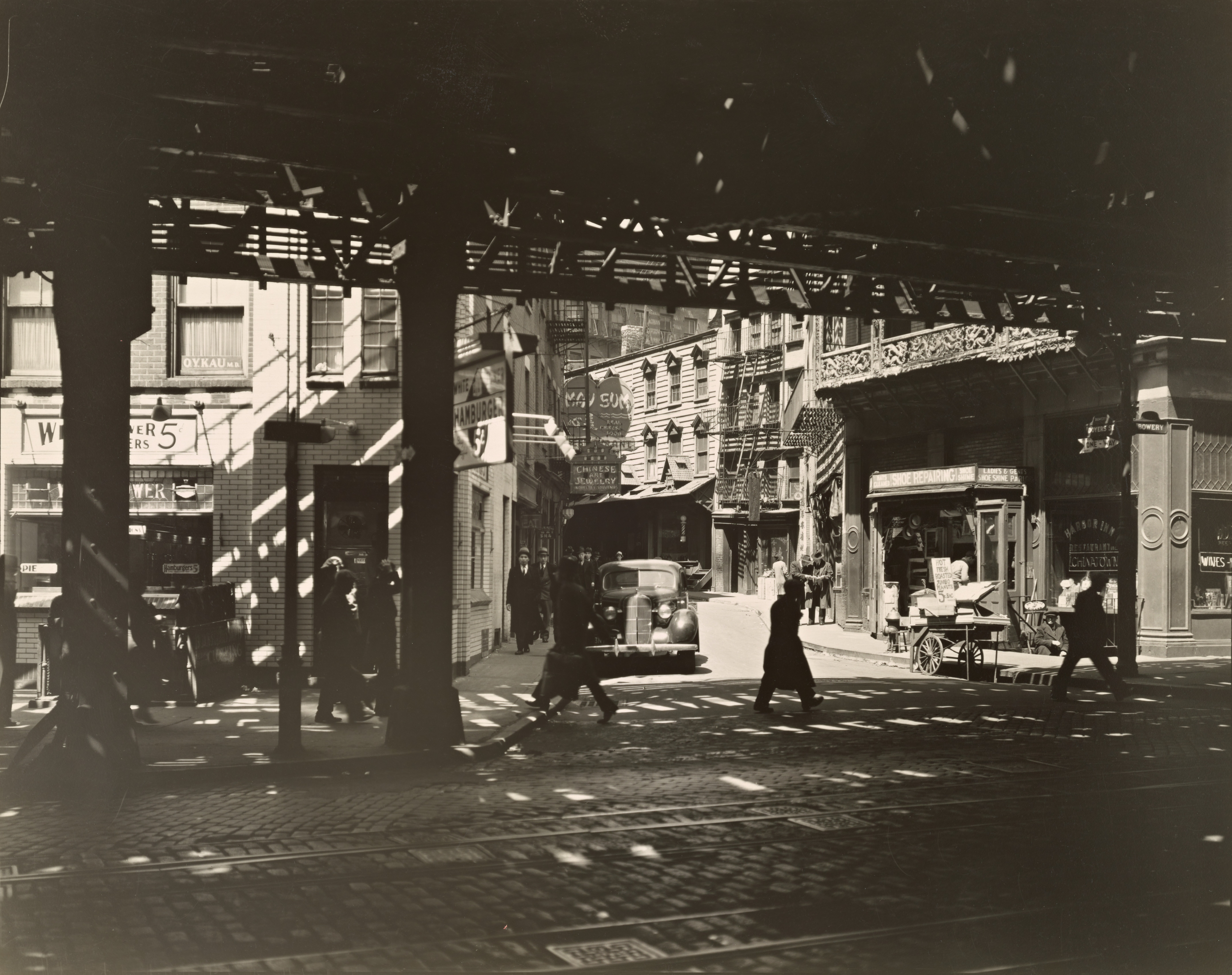
Doyers Street in Chinatown in 1938

In 1873, the United States entered a period of economic difficulty known as the Long Depression. As a result, Americans increasingly competed for jobs that were typically performed by Chinese immigrants. The period was marked by increased racial discrimination, anti-Chinese riots (particularly in California), and new laws that prevented participation in many occupations on the U.S. West Coast. Consequently, many Chinese immigrants moved to the East Coast cities in search of employment.

Early businesses in East Coast cities included hand laundries and restaurants. Chinatown started on Mott, Park (now Mosco), Pell, and Doyers Streets, east of the notorious Five Points district. By 1870 there was a Chinese population of 200. By 1882, when the Chinese Exclusion Act was passed, the population was up to 2,000 residents. In 1900, the US Census reported 7,028 Chinese males in residence, but only 142 Chinese women. This significant gender inequality remained until the repeal of the Chinese Exclusion Act in 1943. Wenfei Wang, Shangyi Zhou, and C. Cindy Fan, authors of "Growth and Decline of Muslim Hui Enclaves in Beijing", wrote that because of immigration restrictions, Chinatown continued to be "virtually a bachelor society" until 1965.

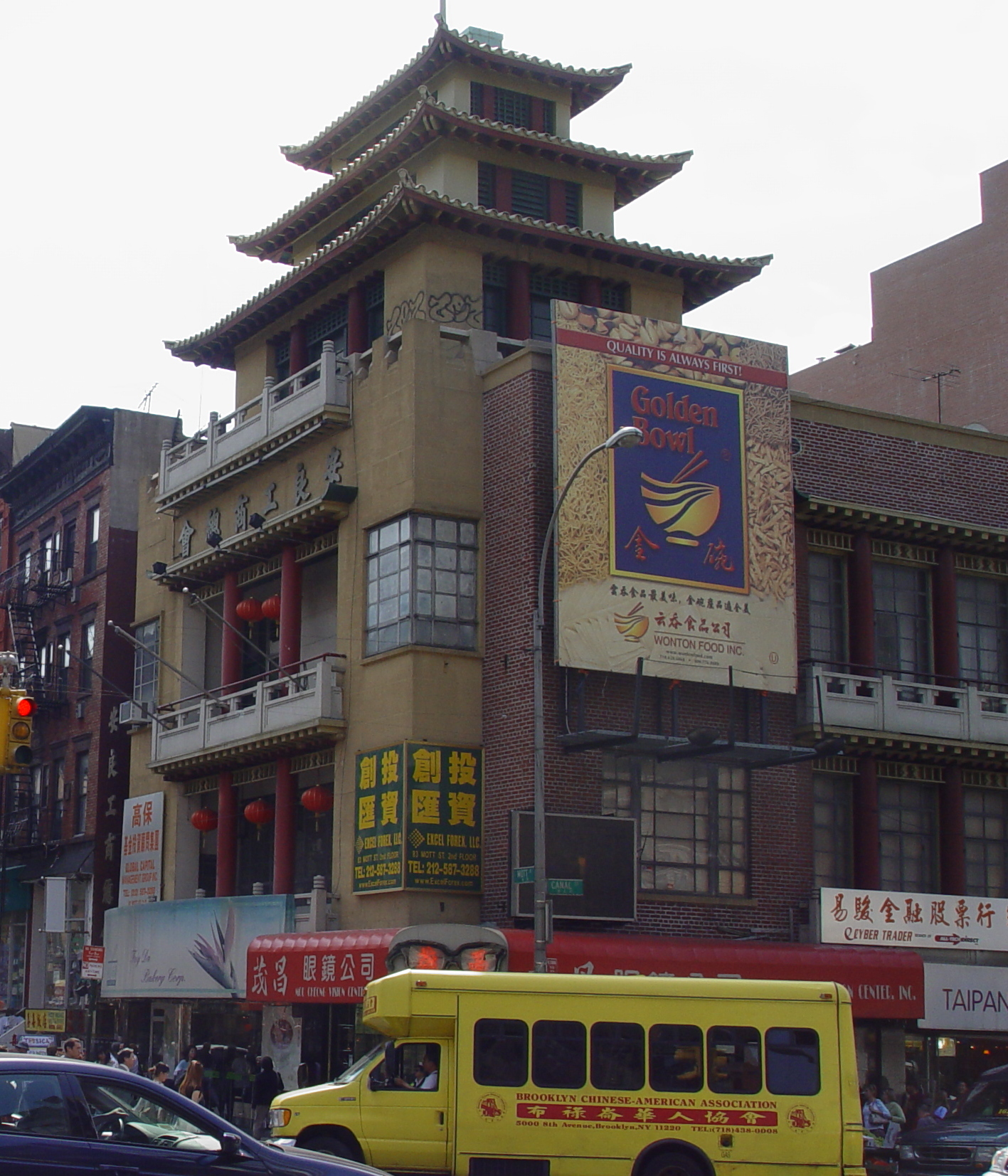
The landmark On Leong Building (安良堂) at the intersection of Canal Street and Mott Street in Chinatown

The early days of Chinatown were dominated by Chinese "tongs" (now sometimes rendered neutrally as "associations"), which were a mixture of clan associations, landsman's associations, political alliances (Kuomintang (Nationalists) vs Chinese Communist Party), and more secretly, crime syndicates. The associations started to give protection from anti-Chinese harassment. Each of these associations was aligned with a street gang. The associations were a source of assistance to new immigrants, giving out loans, aiding in starting businesses, and so forth. The associations formed a governing body named the Chinese Consolidated Benevolent Association. Though this body was meant to foster relations between the Tongs, open warfare periodically flared between the On Leong and Hip Sing tongs. Much of the Chinese gang warfare took place on Doyers street. Gangs like the Ghost Shadows and Flying Dragons were prevalent until the 1990s. The Chinese gangs controlled certain territories of Manhattan's Chinatown. The On Leong and its affiliate Ghost Shadows were of Cantonese and Toishan descent, and controlled Mott, Bayard, Canal, and Mulberry Streets. The Flying Dragons and its affiliate Hip Sing also of Cantonese and Toishan descent controlled Doyers, Pell, Bowery, Grand, and Hester Streets. Other Chinese gangs also existed, like the Hung Ching and Chih Kung gangs of Cantonese and Toishan descent, which were affiliated with each other and also gained control of Mott Street. Born to Kill, also known as the Canal Boys, a gang composed almost entirely of Vietnamese immigrants from the Vietnam War under the leadership of David Thai had control over Broadway, Canal, Baxter, Centre, and Lafayette Streets. Fujianese gangs also existed, such as the Tung On gang, which affiliated with Tsung Tsin, and had control over East Broadway, Catherine and Division Streets and the Fuk Ching gang affiliated with Fukien American controlled East Broadway, Chrystie, Forsyth, Eldridge, and Allen Streets. At one point, a gang named the Freemasons gang, which was of Cantonese descent, had attempted to claim East Broadway as its territory.

Columbus Park, the only park in Chinatown, was built in 1897 on what was once the center of the infamous Five Points neighborhood. During the 19th century, this was the most dangerous ghetto area of immigrant New York, as portrayed in the book and film Gangs of New York.

=== Post-1965 reform ===
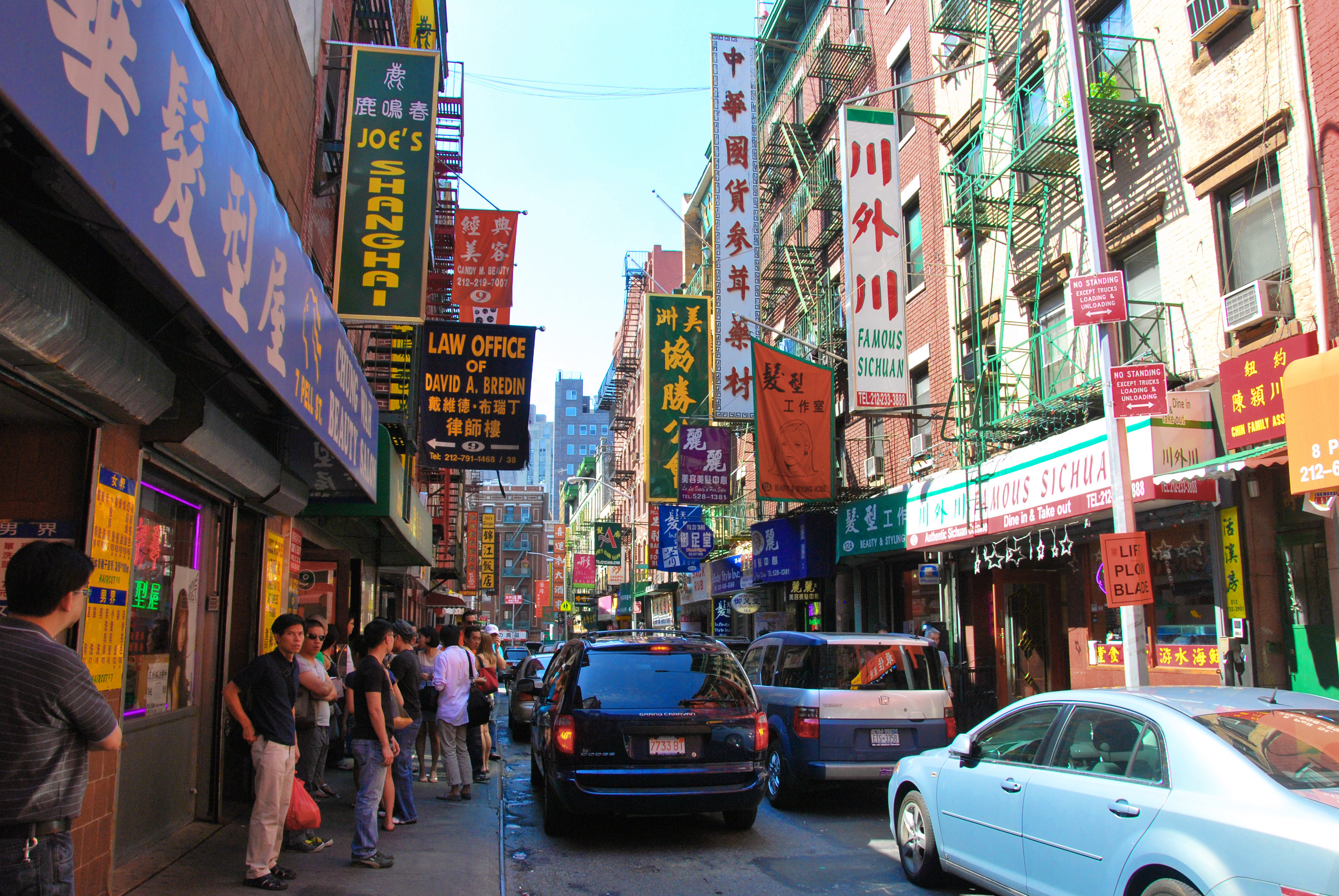
A typical scene on Pell Street, 2009

In the years after the United States enacted the Immigration and Nationality Act of 1965, allowing many more immigrants from Asia into the country, the population of Chinatown increased dramatically. Geographically, much of the growth occurred in neighborhoods to the north. The Chinatown grew and became more oriented toward families due to the lifting of restrictions. In the earliest years of the existence of Manhattan's Chinatown, it had been primarily populated by Taishanese-speaking Chinese immigrants and the borderlines of the enclave was originally Canal Street to the north, Bowery to the east, Worth Street to the south, and Mulberry Street to the west.

==== Influx of immigrants from Hong Kong and Guangdong ====
After 1965, there came a wave of Cantonese speakers from Hong Kong and Guangdong province in mainland China, and Standard Cantonese became the dominant tongue. With the influx of Hong Kong immigrants, it was developing and growing into a Hong Kongese neighborhood, however the growth slowed down later on during the 1980s–90s.

Through the 1970s and 1980s, the influx of Guangdong and Hong Kong immigrants began to develop newer portions of Manhattan's Chinatown going north of Canal Street and then later the east of the Bowery. However, until the 1980s, the western section was the most primarily fully Chinese developed and populated part of Chinatown and the most quickly flourishing busy central Chinese business district with still a little bit of remaining Italians in the very northwest portion around Grand Street and Broome Street, which eventually all moved away and became all Chinese by the 1990s. Although the portion of Chinatown that is east of the Bowery—which is considered part of the Lower East Side already started developing as being part of Chinatown since the influx of Chinese immigrants started spilling over into that section since the 1960s, however until the 1980s, it was still not developing as quickly as the western portion of Chinatown because the proportion and concentration of Chinese residents in the eastern section during that time was comparatively growing at a slower rate and being more scattered than the western section in addition to the fact that there was a higher proportion of remaining non-Chinese residents consisting of Jewish, Puerto Ricans, and a few Italians and African Americans than Chinatown's western section.

During the 1970s and 1980s, the eastern portion of Chinatown east of the Bowery was a very quiet section, and despite fears of crime, it was seen as attractive because of the availability of vacant affordable apartments. Chinese female garment workers were especially targets of crime and often left work together to protect each other as they were heading home. In May 1985, a gang-related shooting injured seven people, including a 4-year-old boy, at 30 East Broadway in Chinatown. Two males, who were 15 and 16 years old and were members of a Chinese street gang, were arrested and convicted.

Many Chinese Vietnamese, Laotian Chinese, Chinese Cambodians, and Malaysian Chinese immigrants also settled into the neighborhood as well.

Starting in the 1970s, Mandarin-speaking Taiwanese immigrants and then many other Non-Cantonese Chinese immigrants also were arriving into New York City. However, due to the traditional dominance of Cantonese-speaking residents, which were largely working class in Manhattan's Chinatown and the neighborhood's poor housing conditions, they were unable to relate to Manhattan's Chinatown and mainly settled in Flushing, creating a more middle class Mandarin Town and an even smaller one in Elmhurst. As a result, Manhattan's Chinatown and Brooklyn's emerging Chinatown were able to continue retaining its traditional, almost-exclusive Cantonese society. However, there was already a small and slow-growing Fuzhou immigrant population in Manhattan's Chinatown since the 1970s–80s in the eastern section of Chinatown east of the Bowery. In the 1990s, though, Chinese people began to move into some parts of the western Lower East Side, which 50 years earlier was populated by Eastern European Jews and 20 years earlier was occupied by Hispanics.

==== Little Fuzhou ====
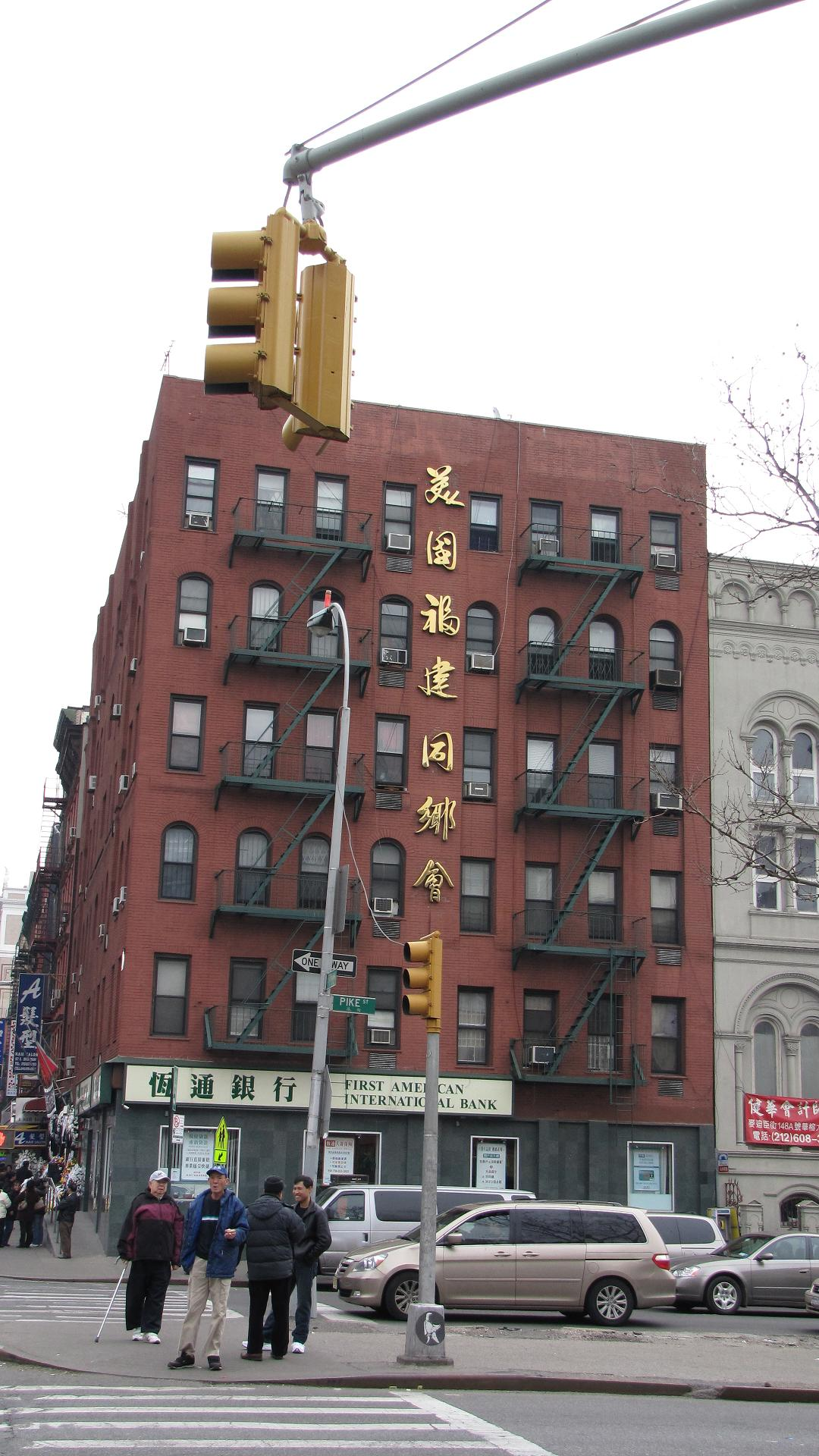
The Fukien American Association on East Broadway in Little Fuzhou

From the late 1980s through the 1990s, when a large influx of immigrants from Fuzhou, who largely also spoke Mandarin along with their native Fuzhou dialect began moving into New York City, they were the only exceptional group of Chinese that were non-Cantonese to largely settle into Manhattan's Chinatown. Due to the fact that the Chinatown area were mostly populated by Cantonese speakers, the Fuzhou speaking immigrants had a lot of trouble relating to the neighborhood linguistically and culturally and as a result, they settled on the eastern borderline of Manhattan's Chinatown east of The Bowery, which during that time was more of an overlapping population of Chinese, Puerto Ricans, and Jewish as well as had significant vacant apartment units and were more affordable than in the more Mandarin-speaking enclaves in Flushing and Elmhurst, and many Fuzhou immigrants had no legal status and being forced into the lowest paying jobs. As they settled in the eastern borderline of Chinatown along East Broadway and Eldridge Street, it became fully part of Chinatown and slowly through the 1990s it would develop into being Little Fuzhou. This has resulted in referring to East Broadway as Fuzhou Street No. 1, which emerged during the late 1980s and early 1990s, and Eldridge Street as Fuzhou Street No. 2, which developed during the mid-1990s and early 2000s. Little Fuzhou became known as a new Chinatown, separate from the older, more Cantonese-dominated Chinatown from The Bowery going west, though there are still a little bit of remaining long time Cantonese residents and businesses in and around what is now the Little Fuzhou enclave.

Not only did the Fuzhou immigration influx establish a new portion of Manhattan's Chinatown, they contributed significantly in maintaining the Chinese population in the neighborhood. They also played a role in property values increasing quickly during the 1990s, in contrast to during the 1980s, when the housing prices were dropping. As a result, landlords were able to generate twice as much income in Manhattan's, Flushing's, and Brooklyn's Chinatowns.

Since the 2010s, gentrification has been setting into the Chinatown neighborhood including the Little Fuzhou enclave. Large numbers of Fuzhou speakers have been rapidly moving out of Manhattan's Chinatown with many shifting to Brooklyn's Chinatown in Sunset Park, which has now overwhelmingly taken over as the largest Fuzhou community of New York City. Many Fuzhou owned businesses have now closed with increasing numbers of storefronts becoming vacant in the enclave and is now increasingly becoming quieter with fewer and fewer consumers walking around.

==== Migration to Brooklyn Chinatown ====
The increasing Fuzhou influx had shifted into the Brooklyn Chinatown in the Sunset Park section of Brooklyn. This shift replaces the Cantonese population throughout Brooklyn's Sunset Park Chinatown significantly more rapidly than in Manhattan's Chinatown. Gentrification in Manhattan's Chinatown has slowed the growth of Fuzhou immigration as well as the growth of Chinese immigrants to Manhattan in general, which is why New York City's rapidly growing Chinese population has now shifted primarily to the boroughs of Queens and Brooklyn.

Some Chinese landlords in Manhattan, especially the many real estate agencies that are mainly of Cantonese ownership, were accused of prejudice against the Fuzhou immigrants, supposedly making Fuzhou immigrants feel unwelcome because concerns that they would not be able to pay rent or debt to gangs that may have helped smuggled them in illegally into the United States, and because of fear that gangs will come up to the apartments to cause trouble. There is also supposedly a concern that Fujianese are more likely to make the apartments too overcrowded by subdividing an apartment into multiple small spaces to rent to other Fuzhou immigrants. This could also be particularly seen on East Broadway.

Although Mandarin is spoken as a native language among only 10 percent of Chinese speakers in Manhattan's Chinatown, it is used as a secondary dialect among the greatest number of them. Although Min Chinese, especially the Fuzhou dialect, is spoken natively by a third of the Chinese population in the city, it is not used as a lingua franca because speakers of other dialect groups do not learn Min.

==== Little Hong Kong/Guangdong ====
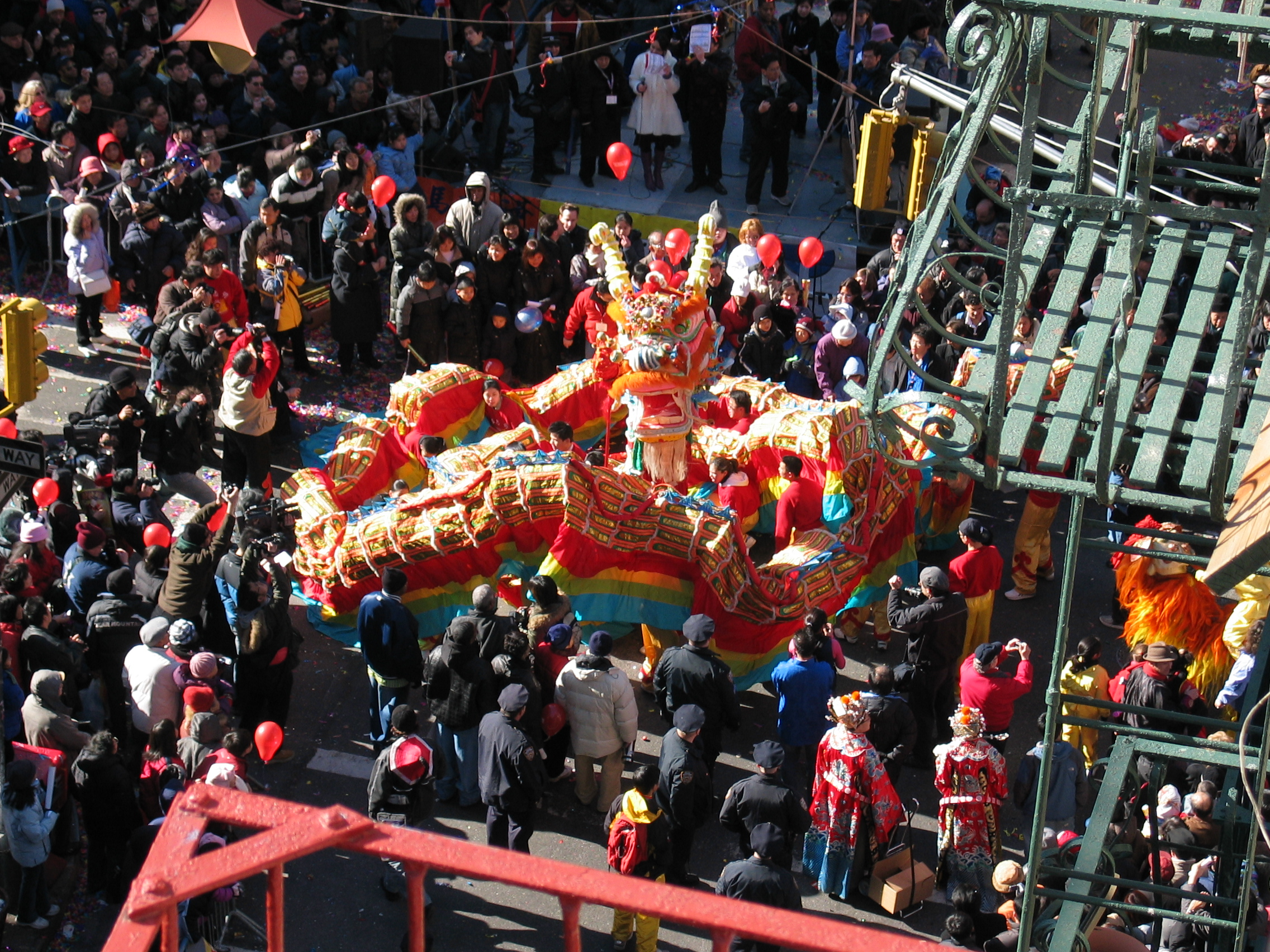
Chinese New Year celebration in Chinatown

As the epicenter of the massive Fuzhou influx has shifted to Brooklyn in the 2000s, Manhattan's Chinatown's Cantonese population remains viable and large and successfully continues to retain its stable Cantonese community identity, maintaining the communal gathering venue established decades ago in the western portion of Chinatown, to shop, work, and socialize—in contrast to the Cantonese population and community identity which are shifting from Brooklyn's original Sunset Park Chinatown to the satellite Chinatowns in Brooklyn.

Although the term Little Hong Kong was used a long time ago to describe Manhattan's Chinatown relating to when an influx of Hong Kong immigrants was pouring in at that time and even though not all Cantonese immigrants come from Hong Kong, this portion of Chinatown has heavy Cantonese characteristics, especially with the Standard Cantonese, which is spoken in Hong Kong and Guangzhou, China being widely used, so it is in many ways a Little Hong Kong.

A more appropriate term would be Little Guangdong-Hong Kong or Cantonese-Hong Kong Town since the Cantonese immigrants do come from different regions of the Guangdong of China including Hong Kong. The long-time established Cantonese Community, which can be considered Little Hong Kong/Guang Dong or known as the Old Chinatown of Manhattan lies along Mott, Pell, Doyer, Bayard, Elizabeth, Mulberry, Canal, and Bowery Streets, within Manhattan's Chinatown.

Newer satellite Little Guangdong-Hong Kong has started to emerge in sections of Bensonhurst and Sheepshead Bay/Homecrest in Brooklyn. However, there are more scattered and mixed in with other ethnic enclaves. This is a result of many Cantonese residents migrating to these neighborhoods. Bensonhurst carries the majority of Brooklyn's Cantonese enclaves/population. Originally, the Sunset Park Chinatown was a small satellite of Manhattan's Western Cantonese Chinatown, but since the 2000s, Cantonese speakers in Brooklyn have been largely shifting to and concentrating in Bensonhurst and Sheepshead Bay/Homecrest while the Sunset Park Chinatown has largely grown into being a very large Fuzhou speaking enclave.

==== Fuzhounese-Cantonese relations ====
The Fuzhou immigration pattern started out in the 1970s, like the Cantonese immigration during the late 1800s to early 1900s that had established Manhattan's Chinatown on Mott Street, Pell Street, and Doyers Street. The immigrants were initially mostly men who later brought their families over. The beginning influx of Fuzhou immigrants arriving during the 1980s and 1990s were entering into a Chinese community that was extremely Cantonese dominated. Due to the Fuzhou immigrants having no legal status and inability to speak Cantonese, many were denied jobs in Chinatown as a result, causing many of them to resort to crimes. There was a lot of Cantonese resentment against Fuzhou immigrants arriving into Chinatown.

== Demographics and culture ==
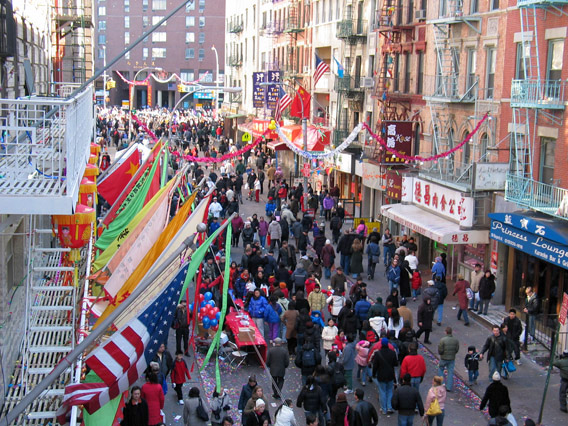
Street fairs are common in Chinatown

In 2000, most of Chinatown's residents came from Asia. That year, the number of residents was 84,840, and 66% of them were Asian.

=== Demographics ===
The census tabulation area for Chinatown is bounded to the north by Houston Street; to the east by Avenue B, Norfolk Street, Essex Street and Pike Street; to the south by Frankfort Street; and to the west by Centre Street and Bowery. Based on data from the 2010 United States census, the population of Chinatown was 47,844, a change of −4,531 (−9.5%) from the 52,375 counted in 2000. Covering an area of 332.27 acres (134.46 ha), the neighborhood had a population density of 144 inhabitants per acre (92,000/sq mi; 36,000/km^{2}). The racial makeup of the neighborhood was 16.3% (7,817) White, 4.8% (2,285) African American, 0.1% (38) Native American, 63.9% (30,559) Asian, 0% (11) Pacific Islander, 0.2% (75) from other races, and 1.3% (639) from two or more races. Hispanic or Latino of any race were 13.4% (6,420) of the population.

The racial composition of Chinatown changed substantially from 2000 to 2010, with the most significant changes being the increase in the White population by 42% (2,321), the decrease in the Asian population by 15% (5,461), and the decrease in the Hispanic / Latino population by 15% (1,121). The Black population decreased by 3% (62) and remained a small minority, while the very small population of all other races decreased by 21% (208).

Chinatown lies in Manhattan Community District 3, which encompasses Chinatown, the East Village, and the Lower East Side. Community District 3 had 171,103 residents as of NYC Health's 2018 Community Health Profile, with an average life expectancy of 82.2 years. This is higher than the median life expectancy of 81.2 for all New York City neighborhoods. Most residents are adults: a plurality (35%) are between the ages of 25 and 44, while 25% are between 45 and 64, and 16% are 65 or older. The ratio of youth and college-aged residents was lower, at 13% and 11%, respectively.

As of 2017, the median household income in Community District 3 was $39,584. In 2018, an estimated 18% of Community District 3 residents lived in poverty, compared to 14% in all of Manhattan and 20% in all of New York City. One in twelve residents (8%) were unemployed, compared to 7% in Manhattan and 9% in New York City. Rent burden, or the percentage of residents who have difficulty paying their rent, is 48% in Community District 3, compared to the boroughwide and citywide rates of 45% and 51% respectively. Based on this calculation, as of 2018, Community District 3 is considered to be gentrifying: according to the Community Health Profile, the district was low-income in 1990 and has seen above-median rent growth up to 2010.

The New York City Department of City Planning released updated 2020 census data on the Asian population of New York City. Manhattan's Chinatown has only 27,200 Asian residents, compared to the neighborhoods of Bensonhurst, Brooklyn (46,000); Sunset Park, Brooklyn (31,400); Flushing, Queens (54,200); and Elmhurst, Queens (55,800).

=== Chinese cultural standards ===
Despite the more recently emerged large Fuzhou population, many of the Chinese businesses in Chinatown are still Cantonese owned. The Cantonese dominated western section of Chinatown also continues to be the main busy Chinese business district. As a result, it has influenced many Fuzhounese to learn Cantonese for businesses, especially large businesses like the Dim Sum restaurants on what is known as Little Fuzhou on East Broadway. The Fuzhounese, the subgroup of non-Cantonese-speaking Chinese with the most interactions with Cantonese, also constitute the majority of non-native Cantonese-speaking Chinese. Many of the Fuzhou immigrants in the 1980s and early 1990s learned to speak Cantonese to maintain jobs and communicate with the Cantonese-speaking population in addition to the fact many of the earlier Fuzhou immigrants had lived in Hong Kong adapting into the Hong Kong culture and speaking Cantonese, which gave them better advantages to integrating into the Chinatown community as it was still very dominantly Cantonese speaking. However, since the 2000s, newer Chinese immigrants have largely spoken Mandarin Chinese, the national language of China.

A significant difference between the two separate Chinese provincial communities in Manhattan's Chinatown is that the Cantonese part of Chinatown not only serves Chinese customers but is also a tourist attraction. However, the Fuzhou part of Chinatown caters less to tourists. Bowery, Chrystie Street, Catherine Street, and Chatham Square encompass the approximate border zone between the Fuzhou and Cantonese communities in Manhattan's Chinatown.

Unlike most other urban Chinatowns, Manhattan's Chinatown is both a residential area as well as commercial area. Many population estimates are in the range of 90,000 to 100,000 residents. One analysis of census data in 2011 showed that Chinatown and heavily Chinese tracts on the Lower East Side had 47,844 residents in the 2010 census, a decrease of nearly 9% since 2000.

=== Rezoning and gentrification ===
In 2008, the New York City Council proposed the East Village/Lower East Side (EVLES) rezoning plan. This plan received objections from the local community and prompted the creation of the Coalition to Protect Chinatown and the Lower East Side; the rezoning was ultimately approved in late 2008. Following community members' protests against the City Council, the city government created the Chinatown Working Group (CWG) to propose rezoning revisions. After the Coalition criticized CWG for excluding the Lower East Side and disproportionate racial and class representation in its new rezoning proposal. After expanding the scope of its zoning boundaries to include both Chinatown and LES, the Coalition joined CWG in 2010 and CWG incorporated the Coalition’s demands for “people first zoning”. From 2010 onwards, competing rezoning plans have been proposed that have countered the efforts of CWG and discouraged coalition building.

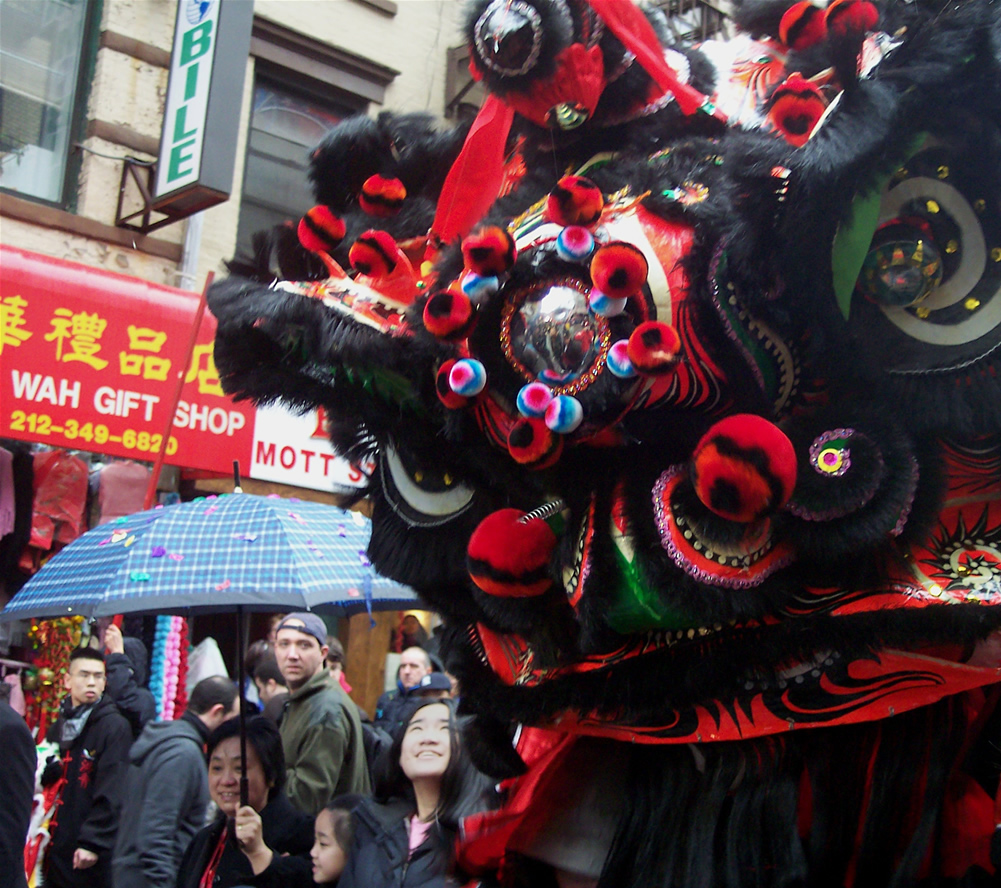
A Chinese lion during Chinese New Year festivities on Mott St. near Worth St.

Civic groups in Chinatown have existed since the formation of the neighborhood, own a large proportion of real estate in Chinatown, and primarily rent to small-businesses and rent-stabilized tenants. These civic groups have faced increasing corporate pressures to sell their property as luxury condominiums began proliferating in Chinatown. Previously, Chinatown was noted for its crowded tenements and primarily Chinese residents. While some projects have targeted the Chinese community, the development of luxury housing has increased Chinatown's economic and cultural diversity. A 2021 N.Y.U Furman poll found that the racial and ethnic composition of Asian identifying individuals within the community dropped from 34.8% in 2000 to 28.1% in 2021, a 6.7% decrease.

Since the early 2000s, there has been a continuously increasing number of buildings in Chinatown, neighboring Two Bridges, and the Lower East Side, taken over by new landlords and real estate developers, who then charged higher rents and/or demolished the buildings to build newer structures. Often, whenever this happens, many Fuzhounese tenants are more likely to be evicted, especially in the eastern portion of Chinatown, where illegal subdivision, overcrowding, lack of leases, and lack of immigrant paperwork are common. In addition, since the 2000s, there have been city officials inspecting apartment buildings and cracking down on illegal units. With tenants that have rent-stabilized leases, legal residency documents, no apartment subdivisions, and a lesser probability of subletting over capacity—most of whom are long-time Cantonese residents—it is usually harder for the newer landlords to be able to force these tenants out, especially including the western portion of Chinatown, which is still mainly Cantonese populated. However, newer landlords still continuously try find other loopholes to force them out.

By 2009, many newer Chinese immigrants settled along East Broadway instead of the historic core west of Bowery. In addition Mandarin began to eclipse Cantonese as the predominant Chinese dialect in New York's Chinatown during the period. The New York Times says that the Flushing Chinatown now rivals Manhattan's Chinatown in terms of being a cultural center for Chinese-speaking New Yorkers' politics and trade.

=== Anti-displacement activism ===
Activism in Chinatown and LES continued past the earlier rezoning debates, with many organizations mobilizing around issues of development and the resulting displacement. The Coalition to Protect Chinatown and LES, originally formed in response to the 2008 EVLES rezoning plan, remains active with a goal to “fight displacement and take control of our community.” In 2024, protests targeted the Museum of Chinese in America (MOCA), where demonstrators criticized the museum's acceptance of funding associated with the construction of a new jail in Chinatown, calling it a "community-buy-back" and linking cultural institutions to a broader process of displacement and redevelopment.

=== Current status as Chinese shopping business district ===
Despite the area's gentrification, it is still a popular Chinese commercial shopping district, frequented by residents of the New York metropolitan area as well as tourists. In addition, high-income professionals are moving into the area and patronizing Chinese businesses. However, commercial activity is not concentrated evenly through Chinatown. The western half of Chinatown (the original Cantonese Chinatown), known as Little Hong Kong/Guangdong, is still relatively active. However, the eastern/southern part of Chinatown, known as Little Fuzhou, has become primarily residential, and thus, the most primarily affected by the decline in business. Businesses in Little Fuzhou may be affected by the spread of gentrification from the nearby Lower East Side and East Village.

In 2016, the oldest continuously run business in Manhattan's Chinatown was up for sale: Wing on Wo and Co, established in 1890. The building was worth around $10 million, including six stories and a store front, one of the only buildings left of its kind in the area. Mei Lum, a grandchild of the original owner, stepped in before the sale and took over the business to preserve its history and position within the neighborhood, to "regenerate, encourage and protect" Chinatown's culture. Lum started the "W.O.W. Project", which hopes to "preserve Chinatown's creative scene through art and activism". Events such as Open Mic nights and exhibitions would start conversations about this neighborhood's past and the people that have lived there. For example, in February 2020, the W.O.W. Project exhibited ethnographic research and oral history interviews that highlighted stories of migration, displacement, and everyday resilience in Chinatowns all over the world. In response to the COVID-19 pandemic in New York City, the W.O.W. Project started a project called Love Letters to Chinatown.

=== Resilience against gentrification ===
Though Chinatown is gentrifying and its Chinese population declining, there are still many rent-stabilized apartment buildings owned by Chinese family landlords and Chinese Associations continuing to house Chinese residents. Confucius Plaza, built as an affordable Mitchell Lama development, retains a sizable Chinese population. In nearby Two Bridges and Lower East Side there is a large concentration of various affordable housing developments that are run by NYCHA, other Mitchell Lama developments, and other various non-profit run developments that also contain a large stable Chinese population. These specific stable populations of Chinese residents in the area continue to highly rely on patronizing the area's Chinese businesses for their cultural needs, which are helping to maintain the significance of the Chinese community's presence from near total disappearance. There also has been a growing presence of Chinese residents moving into affordable housing developments in other parts of Manhattan and northwest Brooklyn often as a result of being priced out of the city's Chinese enclaves they originally resided in and many commute into Manhattan's Chinatown by public transportation to patronize the businesses to meet their cultural needs acting as additional contributors.

Although there are still large numbers of longtime Chinese residents in rent-controlled or rent-stabilized apartments, they are continuously declining as they age out. Many elderly residents have no younger relatives to inherit their units. When these units are vacated, their owners (who are often real-estate firms) often turn the units into market-rate apartments; this is a significant change from the 1970s–90s, when many of these apartments were owned by Chinese landlords or smaller companies.

== Streetscape ==
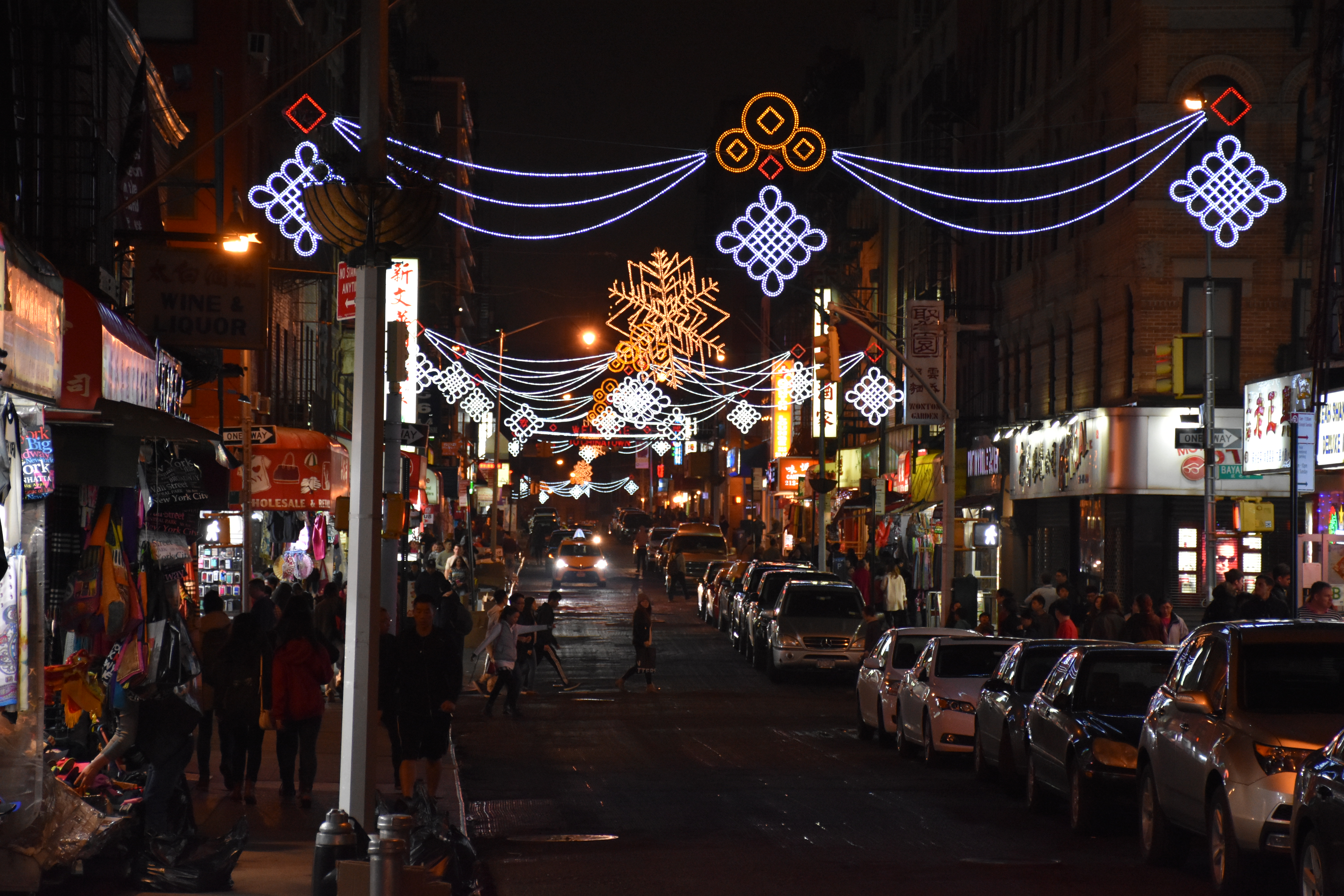
Looking north on Mott Street at night in 2015. Manhattan's Chinatown is home to the highest concentration of Chinese people in the Western Hemisphere.

== Economy ==
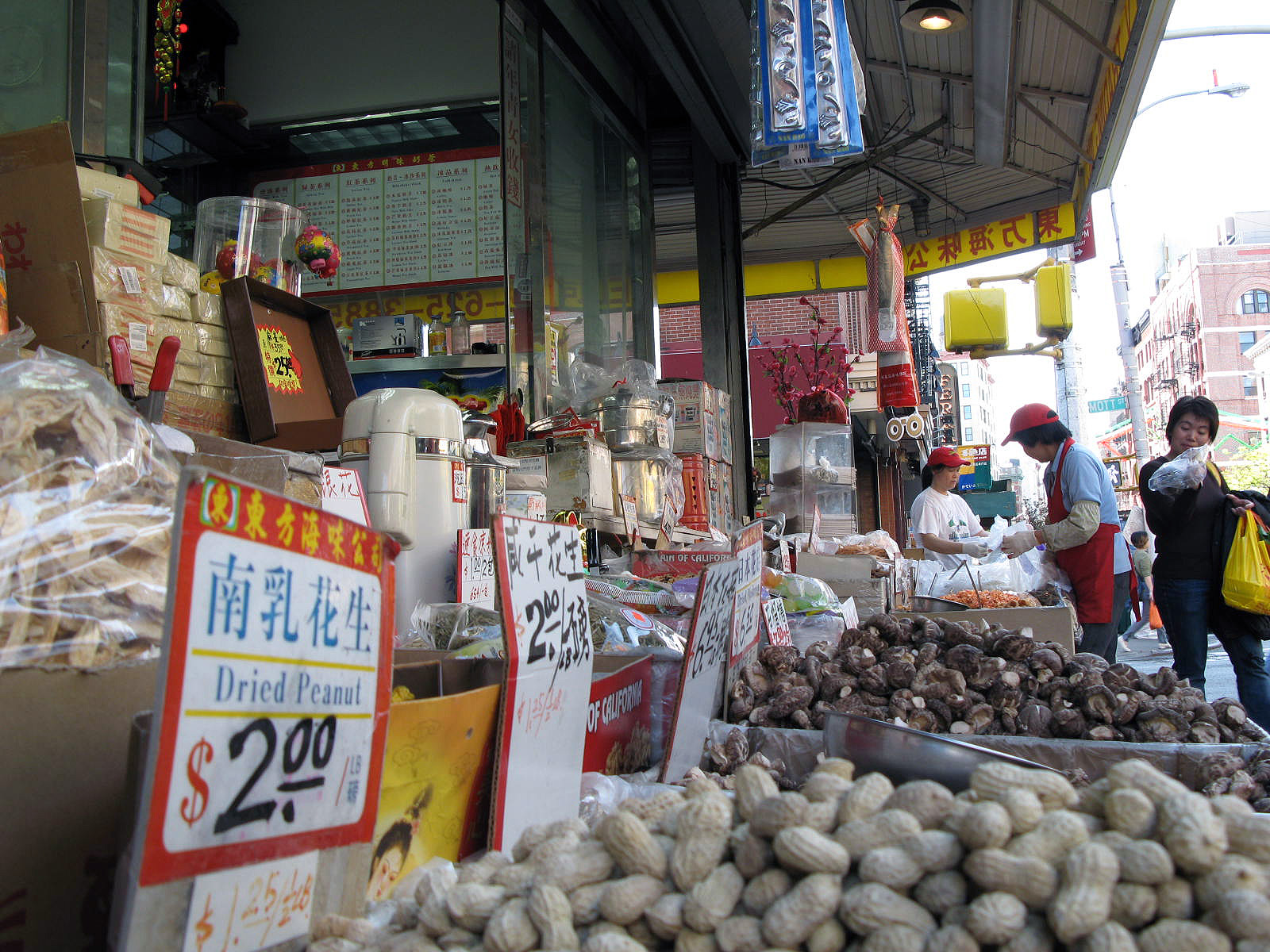
A Chinatown grocery store

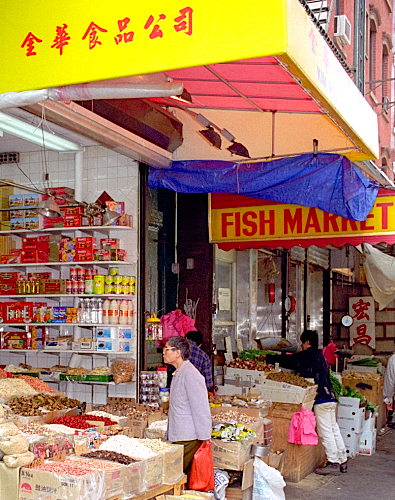
A fish market in Chinatown

Chinese greengrocers and fishmongers are clustered around Mott Street, Mulberry Street, Canal Street (by Baxter Street), and all along East Broadway (especially by Catherine Street). The Chinese jewelers' district is on Canal Street between Mott and Bowery. There are many Asian and American banks in the neighborhood. Canal Street, west of Broadway (especially on the Northside), is filled with street vendors selling knock-off brands of perfumes, watches, and handbags. This section of Canal Street was previously the home of warehouse stores selling surplus/salvage electronics and hardware.

In addition, tourism and restaurants are major industries. The district boasts many historical and cultural attractions, and it is a destination for tour companies like Manhattan Walking Tour, Big Onion, NYC Chinatown Tours, and Lower East Side History Project. Tour stops often include landmarks like the Church of the Transfiguration and the Lin Zexu and Confucius statues. The enclave's many restaurants also support the tourism industry. In Chinatown, more than 300 Chinese restaurants provide employment. Notable and well-reviewed Chinatown establishments include Joe's Shanghai, Jing Fong, New Green Bo and Amazing 66.

Other contributors to the economy include factories. The proximity of the fashion industry has kept some garment work in the local area, though much of the garment industry has since moved to China. The local garment industry now concentrates on quick production in small volumes and piece work, which is generally done at the worker's home. Much of the population growth is due to immigration.

The September 11, 2001 attacks caused a decline in business for stores and restaurants in Chinatown. Chinatown was adversely affected by the attacks; being so physically close to Ground Zero, Chinatown saw a very slow return of tourism and business. Part of the reason was the NYPD closure of Park Row, one of two major roads linking the Financial District with Chinatown (the other being Centre Street). However, the area's economy, as well as tourism, have rebounded since then. A Chinatown business improvement district was established in 2011 despite opposition from business owners in the community.

The neighborhood is home to several large Chinese supermarkets. In August 2011, a new branch of New York Supermarket opened on Mott Street in the central district of grocery and food shopping of Manhattan's Chinatown. Just a block away from New York Supermarket, is a Hong Kong Supermarket located on the corner of Elizabeth and Hester Streets. These two supermarkets are among the largest Chinese supermarkets carrying all different food varieties within the long-time established Cantonese community in the western section of Manhattan's Chinatown. A Hong Kong Supermarket at East Broadway and Pike Street burned down in 2009 and plans to construct a 91-room Marriott Hotel in its place resulted in community protests. The New York Supermarkets chain, which also operates markets in Elmhurst and Flushing, settled with the New York State Attorney General in 2008 in which it paid back wages and overtime to workers. Many of the Chinese restaurant menus in the U.S. are printed in Chinatown, Manhattan.

Manhattan's Chinatown has had a history of mini malls with varieties of small shops, however due to the gentrification, this trend has been declining. However, two significant well known mini malls in Manhattan's Chinatown still exist and stand out the most, which are Elizabeth Center at 13 Elizabeth Street right next to NYPD's 5th precinct and East Broadway Mall at 88 East Broadway under the Manhattan Bridge. Elizabeth Center is a Hong Kong style shopping center with varieties of shops with most of them being owned by Cantonese speakers along with some owned by other Chinese speakers as well and is located in the longer time established western Cantonese Chinatown, therefore their customer base are largely Cantonese speakers from the local neighborhoods as well as from other places, however other Chinese speakers from the local area and from other places including Chinese tourists also come to shop at this mini mall. Elizabeth Center also attracts a lot of Non-Asian tourists and visitors and it is often very popular with younger generation customers of Chinese and non-Chinese descents due to the significant concentration of stores that sell varieties of affordable accessories as well as cartoon figure and Action figure products.

East Broadway Mall, at 88 East Broadway, was developed in the late 1980s on a city-owned plot of land under the Manhattan Bridge. When East Broadway Mall opened, their storefront owners and customer base were mainly Cantonese speakers as the Chinese speaking population in the area was still very Cantonese speaking, however as early as the 1980s, a Fuzhouese-speaking population already had begun growing in the East Broadway neighborhood, which eventually by the 1990s had slowly grown into a Fuzhou speaking enclave distinct from the original older established Cantonese Chinatown from Bowery Street going west and then reflectively the storefront owners and customer base at East Broadway Mall then slowly shifted to majority Fuzhou speakers. The area's Fuzhouese-speaking population has been declining since the 2010s due to gentrification, and many residents relocated to New York City's outer boroughs. The COVID-19 pandemic in New York City exacerbated the situation at East Broadway Mall, and the dim sum restaurant upstairs, which had operated for a long time, was closed. Elizabeth Center has done marginally better, and many tenants remained during the COVID-19 pandemic. By contrast, East Broadway Mall went from having around 80 stores to roughly 17 during the pandemic. Media sources reported in November 2021 that the New York state government was giving $20 million to revitalize several city-owned properties in the area. Some proposals have been made to convert the interiors of the East Broadway Mall into a community theater, with commercial stores outdoors. However, Curbed reported in October 2022 that the government grant was being rescinded from East Broadway Mall.

== Satellite Chinatowns ==
For a long time, Manhattan's Chinatown has always been the most largely concentrated Chinese population in New York City, a city where 6% of the overall population is Chinese American. However, in recent years growing Chinese populations in the outer boroughs have tremendously outnumbered Manhattan's Chinese population. Other New York City Chinese communities have been settled over the years, including that of Flushing in Queens, particularly along from Roosevelt Avenue to Main Street through Kissena Boulevard.

Another Chinese community is located in Sunset Park in Brooklyn, particularly along 8th Avenue from 40th to 65th Streets. New York City's newer Chinatowns have recently sprung up in Elmhurst and Corona, Queens (which border each other and are part of the same Chinatown), on Avenue U in the Homecrest section of Brooklyn, as well as in Bensonhurst, also in Brooklyn. Outside New York City proper, rapidly growing suburban Chinatowns are developing within the New York metropolitan area in nearby Edison, New Jersey and Nassau County, Long Island.

While the composition of these satellite Chinatowns are as varied as the original, the political factions in the original Manhattan Chinatown (Tongs, Republic of China loyalists, People's Republic of China loyalists, and those apathetic) have led to some factionalization in the satellite Chinatowns.

=== Satellite Chinatowns' demographics ===
The Flushing Chinatown was spearheaded by many Chinese following the Handover of Hong Kong in 1997 as well as Taiwanese who used their considerable capital to buy out the land from the former residents. The Chinatowns of Flushing and Elmhurst are more middle class and were initially mainly small Taiwanese Mandarin-speaking enclaves, but have since grown very large and very diversified with Chinese migrants from many various regions from mainland China also often speaking Mandarin along with their regional dialects. Flushing is now the largest Chinatown of New York City and has taken over as being the main Chinese cultural center due to the very high diversity of Chinese immigrants from many various regions of mainland China and Taiwan.

There are three major Brooklyn Chinatowns. Unlike the Chinese enclaves in Queens, which has a very high diversity of Chinese immigrants from various regions of mainland China and Taiwan, the Brooklyn Chinatowns are very segregated into Cantonese dominated enclaves in Bensonhurst and Sheepshead Bay and the Fuzhou dominated enclave in Sunset Park, although with some significant limited population of long-time Cantonese residents. The Sunset Park Chinatown originally emerged as a small Cantonese enclave, but with the large influx of Fuzhou immigrants arriving into Sunset Park since the 2000s, it has grown into becoming the largest Fuzhou Chinatown of New York City, although some Cantonese people remain in the Sunset Park area. The Bensonhurst and Sheepshead Bay Chinatowns are primarily Cantonese populated as a result of many of them migrating away from both Chinatowns of Manhattan and Brooklyn Sunset Park including new Cantonese immigration. Bensonhurst Chinatown's Chinese population is growing faster than that of Sunset Park. According to the 2010 census information, Bensonhurst and the nearby neighborhood of Bath Beach in Brooklyn together constituted New York City's largest concentrated community of Hong Kong Residents (with 3,723 in Bensonhurst and 1,049 in Bath Beach totaling together at 4,772), even though they are very heavily mixed in with the area's much larger Cantonese community consisting mostly of Cantonese speaking immigrants from Mainland China's Guangdong, and although most of the Hong Kong residents are scattered across many other neighborhoods of New York City while only roughly about less than a quarter of New York City's Hong Kong residents reside in Bensonhurst/Bath Beach.

NYC Dept. Of City Planning provided updated 2020 census data on the Asian population of New York City. Bensonhurst now has 46,000 Asian Residents while Sunset Park had 31,400 Asian Residents, which means Bensonhurst now has the highest Asian population of Brooklyn surpassing Sunset Park as the original epicenter of Brooklyn's Asian population. The Asian population in Bensonhurst and Sunset Park are still overwhelmingly Chinese residents. Queens neighborhoods of Flushing (54,200 Asian Residents) and Elmhurst(55,800 Asian Residents) still hold the largest Asian populations in all of New York City though. Manhattan's Chinatown Asian population ranks at 27,200 residents.

== Buildings ==
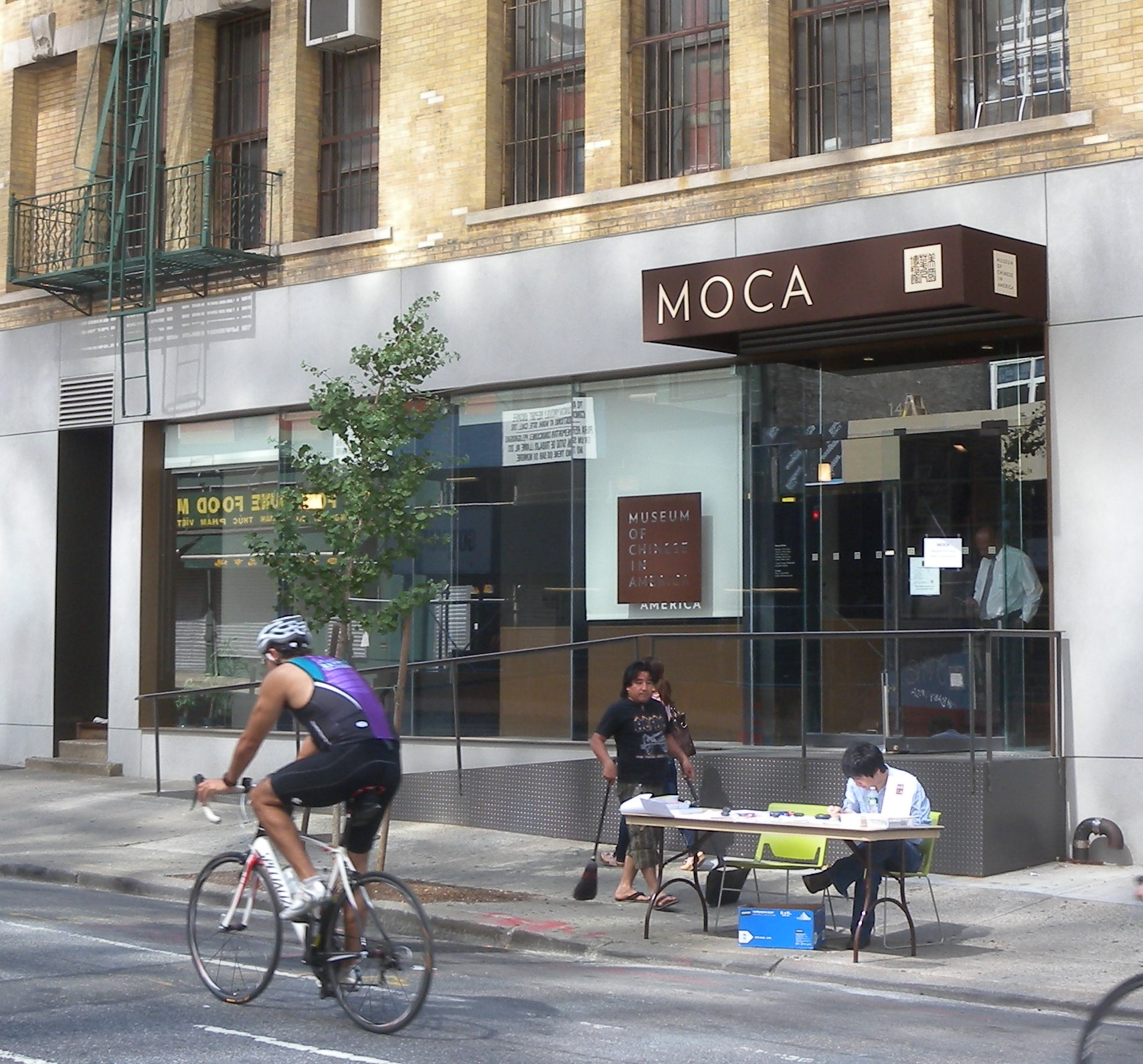
The Chinese American experience has been documented at the Museum of Chinese in America in Manhattan's Chinatown since 1980.

For much of Chinatown's history, there were few unique architectural features to announce to visitors that they had arrived in the neighborhood (other than the language of the shop signs). In 1962, the Lieutenant Benjamin Ralph Kimlau Memorial archway at Chatham Square was erected in memorial of the Chinese-Americans who died in World War II, designed by local architect Poy Gum Lee (1900–1968). This memorial bears calligraphy by the great Yu Youren (1879–1964). A statue of Lin Zexu, also known as Commissioner Lin, a Foochowese Chinese official who opposed the opium trade, is also located at the square; it faces uptown along East Broadway, now home to the bustling Fuzhou neighborhood and known locally as Fuzhou Street.

More decorations and cultural institutions followed. In the 1970s, New York Telephone, then the local phone company, started capping the street phone booths with pagoda-like decorations. In 1976, the statue of Confucius in front of Confucius Plaza became a common meeting place. In the 1980s, banks that opened new branches and others that were renovating started to use Chinese traditional styles for their building facades. The Church of the Transfiguration, a national historic site built in 1815, stands off Mott Street. The Chinese American experience has been documented at the Museum of Chinese in America in Manhattan's Chinatown since 1980. In addition, Pearl River Mart, which opened in 1971, has become one of the more notable family-owned stores in Chinatown.

In 2010, Chinatown and Little Italy were listed in a single historic district on the National Register of Historic Places.

=== Housing ===
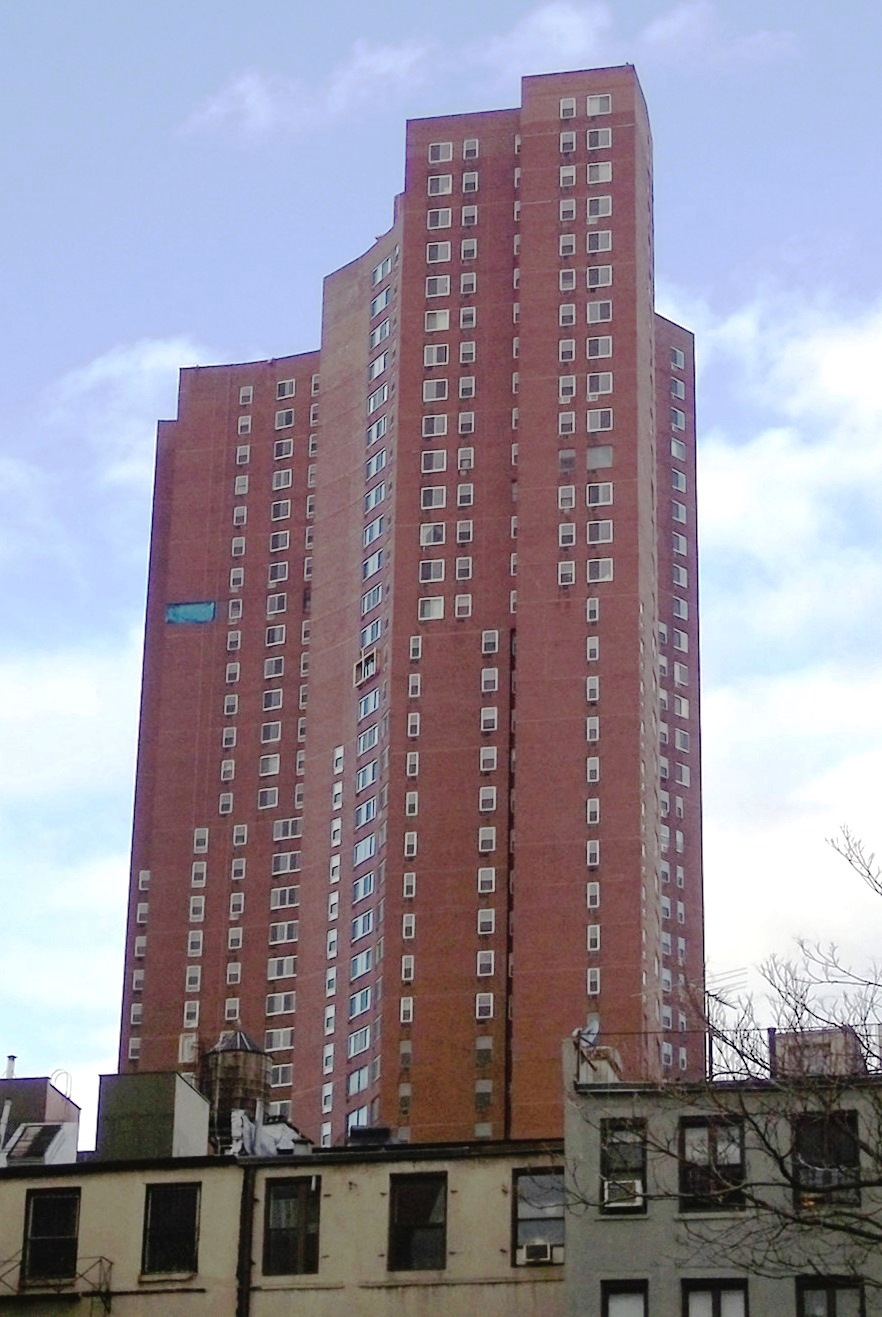
Confucius Plaza, a 44-story subsidized housing cooperative, above typical Chinatown housing stock.

The housing stock of Chinatown is still mostly composed of cramped tenement buildings, some of which are over 100 years old. It is still common in such buildings to have bathrooms in the hallways, to be shared among multiple apartments. A federally subsidized housing project, named Confucius Plaza, was completed on the corner of Bowery and Division Street in 1976. This 44-story residential tower block gave much needed new housing stock to thousands of residents. The building also housed a new public grade school, PS 124 (or Yung Wing Elementary). Besides being the first and largest affordable housing complex specifically available to the Chinatown population Confucius Plaza is also a cultural and institutional landmark, springing forth community organization, Asian Americans for Equality (AAFE), one of Chinatown's oldest political/community organizations, founded in 1974.

=== Chinese theaters ===
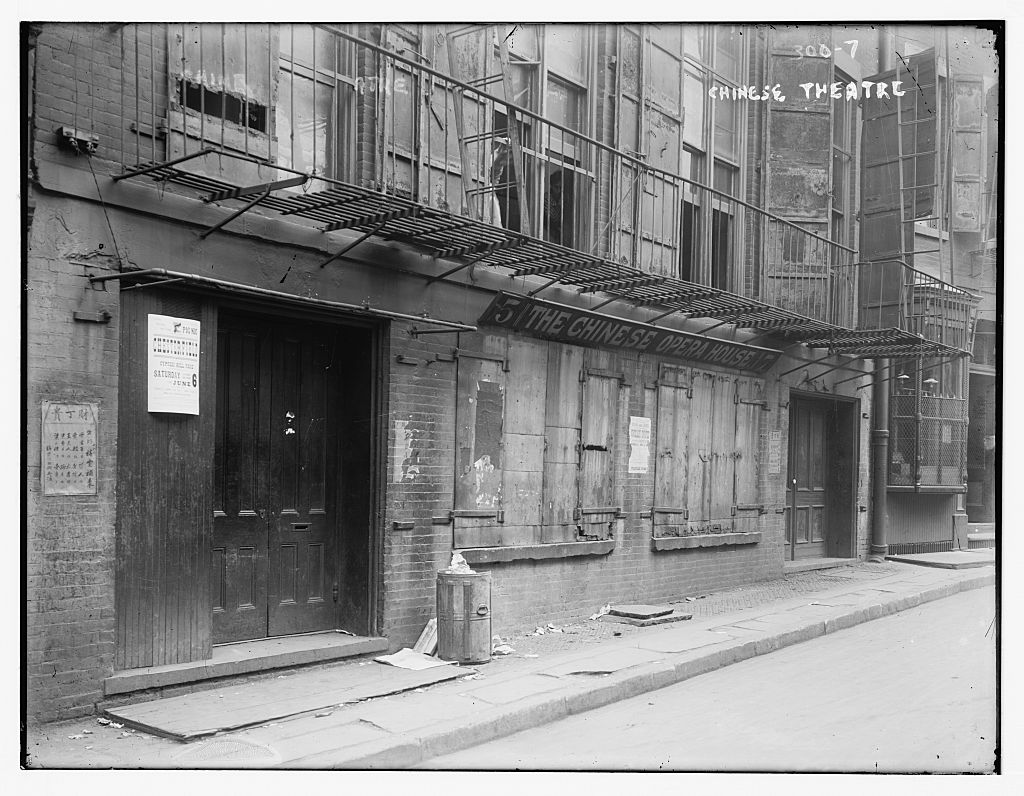
The city's first Chinese theater, on Doyers Street

In the past, Chinatown had Chinese movie theaters that provided entertainment to the Chinese population. The first Chinese-language theater in the city was located at 5–7 Doyers Street from 1893 to 1911. The theater was later converted into a rescue mission for the homeless from Bowery. In 1903, the theater was the site of a fundraiser by the Chinese community for Jewish victims of a massacre in Kishinev.

Among the theaters that existed in Chinatown in later years were the Sun Sing Theater under the Manhattan Bridge and the Pagoda Theater, both on the street of East Broadway, the Governor Theater on Chatham Square, the Rosemary Theater on Canal Street across the Manhattan Bridge, as well as the Music Palace on the Bowery, which was the last Chinese theater to close. Others have existed in different sections of Chinatown. These theaters now have all closed because of more accessibility to videotapes, which were more affordable and provided more genres of movies and much later on DVDs and VCDs became available. Other factors such as, availability of Chinese cable channels, karaoke bars, and gambling in casinos began to provide other options for the Chinese to have entertainment also influenced the Chinese theaters to go out of business.

== Police and crime ==
Chinatown is patrolled by the 5th Precinct of the NYPD, located at 19 Elizabeth Street. The 5th Precinct and the adjacent 7th Precinct ranked 58th safest out of 69 patrol areas for per-capita crime in 2010. As of 2018, with a non-fatal assault rate of 42 per 100,000 people, Chinatown and the Lower East Side's rate of violent crimes per capita is less than that of the city as a whole. The incarceration rate of 449 per 100,000 people is higher than that of the city as a whole.

The 5th Precinct has a lower crime rate than in the 1990s, with crimes across all categories that have decreased by 77.1% between 1990 and 2019. The precinct reported 6 murders, 14 rapes, 91 robberies, 210 felony assaults, 101 burglaries, 585 grand larcenies, and 16 grand larcenies auto in 2019.

== Fire safety ==
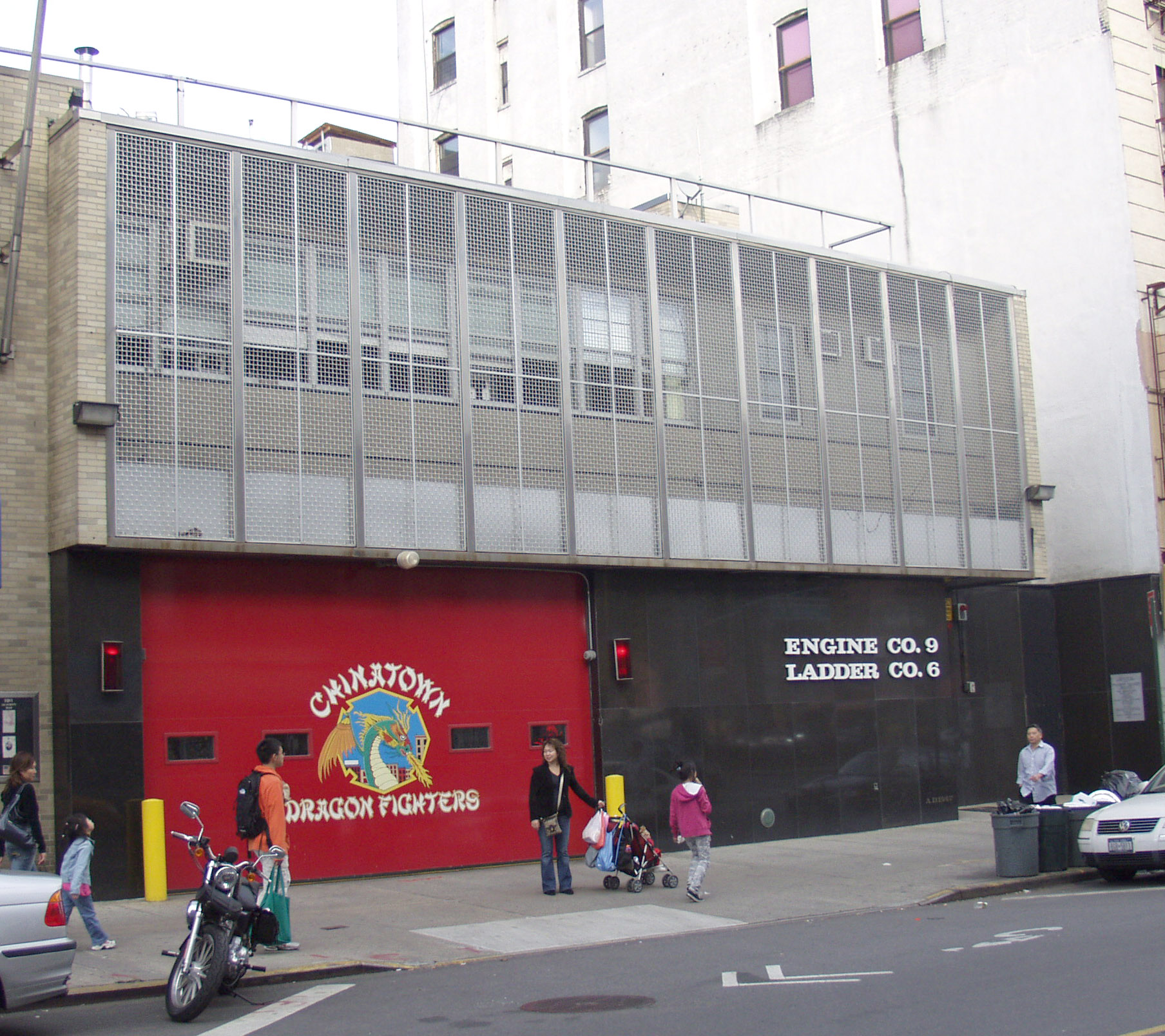
Quarters of New York City Fire Department Engine Company 9/Ladder Company 6

Chinatown is served by two New York City Fire Department (FDNY) fire stations:

- Engine Company 9/Ladder Company 6 – 75 Canal Street
- Engine Company 55/Battalion 2 – 363 Broome Street

== Health ==
As of 2018, preterm births and births to teenage mothers are less common in Chinatown and the Lower East Side than in other places citywide. In Chinatown and the Lower East Side, there were 82 preterm births per 1,000 live births (compared to 87 per 1,000 citywide), and 10.1 teenage births per 1,000 live births (compared to 19.3 per 1,000 citywide). Chinatown and the Lower East Side have a low population of residents who are uninsured. In 2018, this population of uninsured residents was estimated to be 11%, slightly less than the citywide rate of 12%.

The concentration of fine particulate matter, the deadliest type of air pollutant, in Chinatown and the Lower East Side is 0.0089 milligrams per cubic metre (8.9×10^{−9} oz/ft^{3}), more than the city average. Twenty percent of Chinatown and Lower East Side residents are smokers, which is more than the city average of 14% of residents being smokers. In Chinatown and the Lower East Side, 10% of residents are obese, 11% are diabetic, and 22% have high blood pressure—compared to the citywide averages of 24%, 11%, and 28% respectively. In addition, 16% of children are obese, compared to the citywide average of 20%.

Eighty-eight percent of residents eat some fruits and vegetables every day, which is about the same as the city's average of 87%. In 2018, 70% of residents described their health as "good", "very good", or "excellent", less than the city's average of 78%. For every supermarket in Chinatown and the Lower East Side, there are 18 bodegas.

The nearest major hospital is NewYork-Presbyterian Lower Manhattan Hospital in the Civic Center area.

== Post offices and ZIP Codes ==
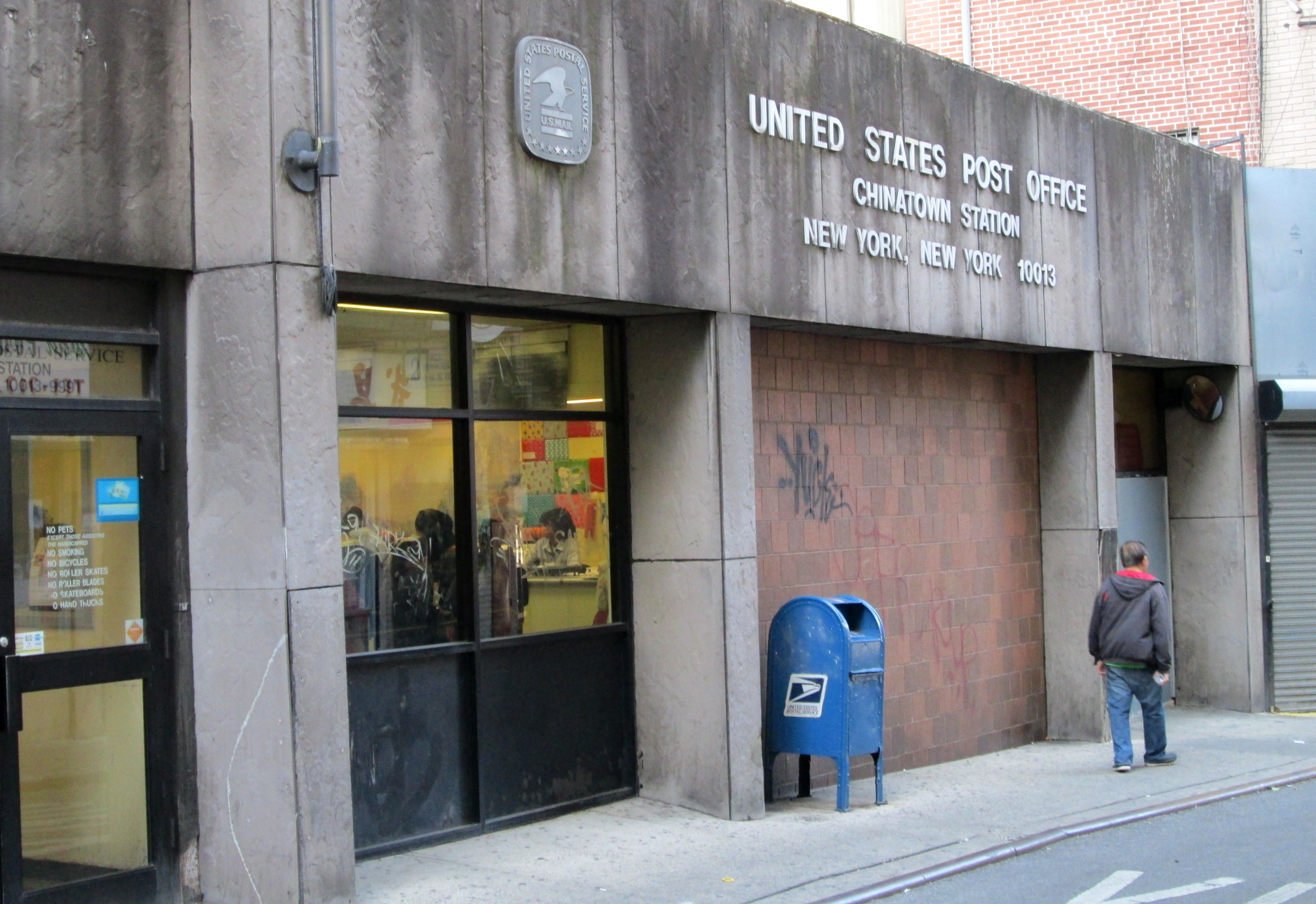
USPS Chinatown Station

Chinatown is located within two primary ZIP Codes. The area east of Bowery is part of 10002, while the area west of Bowery is part of 10013. The United States Postal Service operates two post offices in Chinatown:

- Chinatown Station – 6 Doyers Street
- Knickerbocker Station – 128 East Broadway

== Education ==
Chinatown and the Lower East Side generally have a higher rate of college-educated residents than the rest of the city as of 2018. A plurality of residents age 25 and older (48%) have a college education or higher, while 24% have less than a high school education and 28% are high school graduates or have some college education. By contrast, 64% of Manhattan residents and 43% of city residents have a college education or higher. The percentage of Chinatown and the Lower East Side students excelling in math rose from 61% in 2000 to 80% in 2011 and reading achievement increased from 66% to 68% during the same period.

Chinatown and the Lower East Side's rate of elementary school student absenteeism is lower than the rest of New York City. In Chinatown and the Lower East Side, 16% of elementary school students missed twenty or more days per school year, less than the citywide average of 20%. Additionally, 77% of high school students in Chinatown and the Lower East Side graduate on time, more than the citywide average of 75%.

=== Schools ===
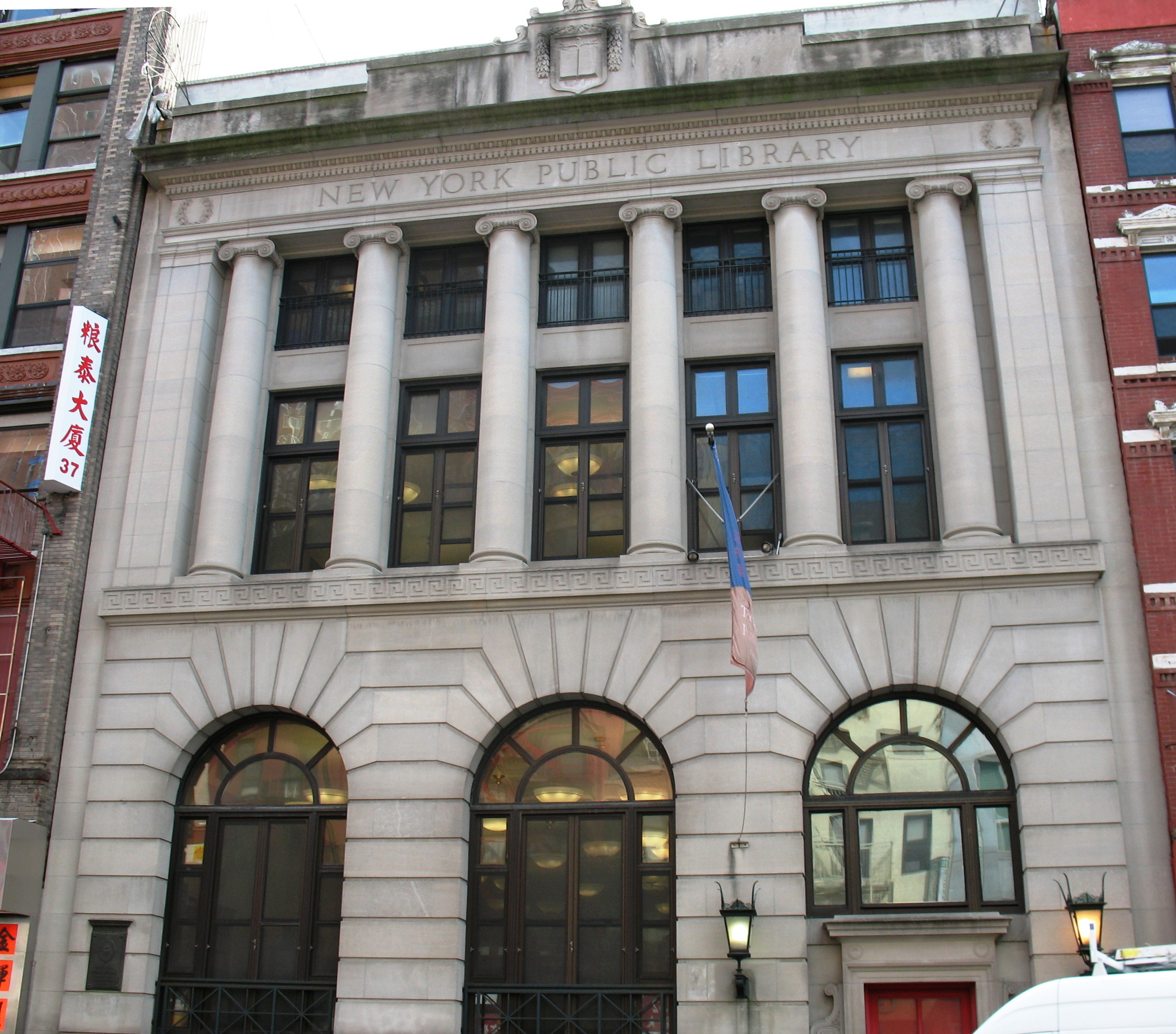
New York Public Library, Chatham Square branch

Residents are zoned to schools in the New York City Department of Education. PS 124, The Yung Wing School is located in Chinatown. It was named after Yung Wing, the first Chinese person to study at Yale University. PS 130 Hernando De Soto is located in Chinatown. PS 184 Shuang Wen School, a bilingual Chinese-English School which opened in 1998, is a non-zoned school in proximity to Chinatown.

=== Library ===
The New York Public Library (NYPL) operates the Chatham Square branch at 33 East Broadway. The branch was founded in 1899; the current Carnegie library building opened in 1903 and was renovated in 2001. The four-story library contains a large Chinese collection, which has been housed at the library since 1911.

== Transportation ==
There are two New York City Subway stations that are directly in the neighborhood—Grand Street (B and D) and Canal Street (4, 6, <6>, J, N, Q, R, W, and Z)—although the East Broadway station on the F train is located on the eastern part of Chinatown while other stations are also nearby. New York City Bus routes include M9, M15, M15 SBS, M22, M55, M103.

The Manhattan Bridge connects Chinatown to Downtown Brooklyn. The FDR Drive runs along the East River, where the East River Greenway, a pedestrian walkway and bikeway, is also present.

The major cultural streets are Mott Street and East Broadway; on the other hand, Canal Street, Allen Street, Delancey Street, Grand Street, East Broadway, and Bowery are the main traffic arteries.

There are multiple bike lanes in the area as well.

=== Street names in Chinese ===
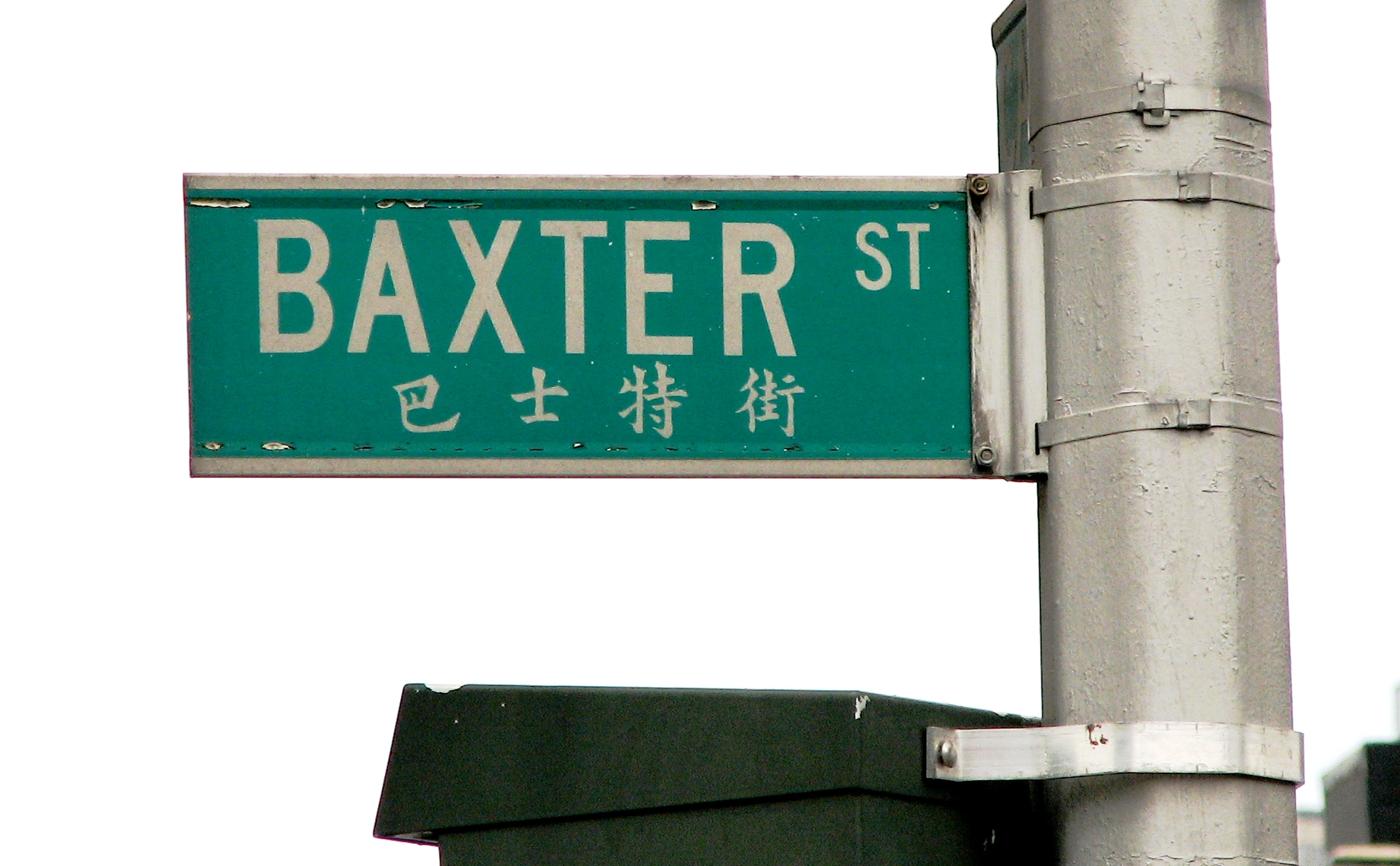
Bilingual signage of Baxter Street

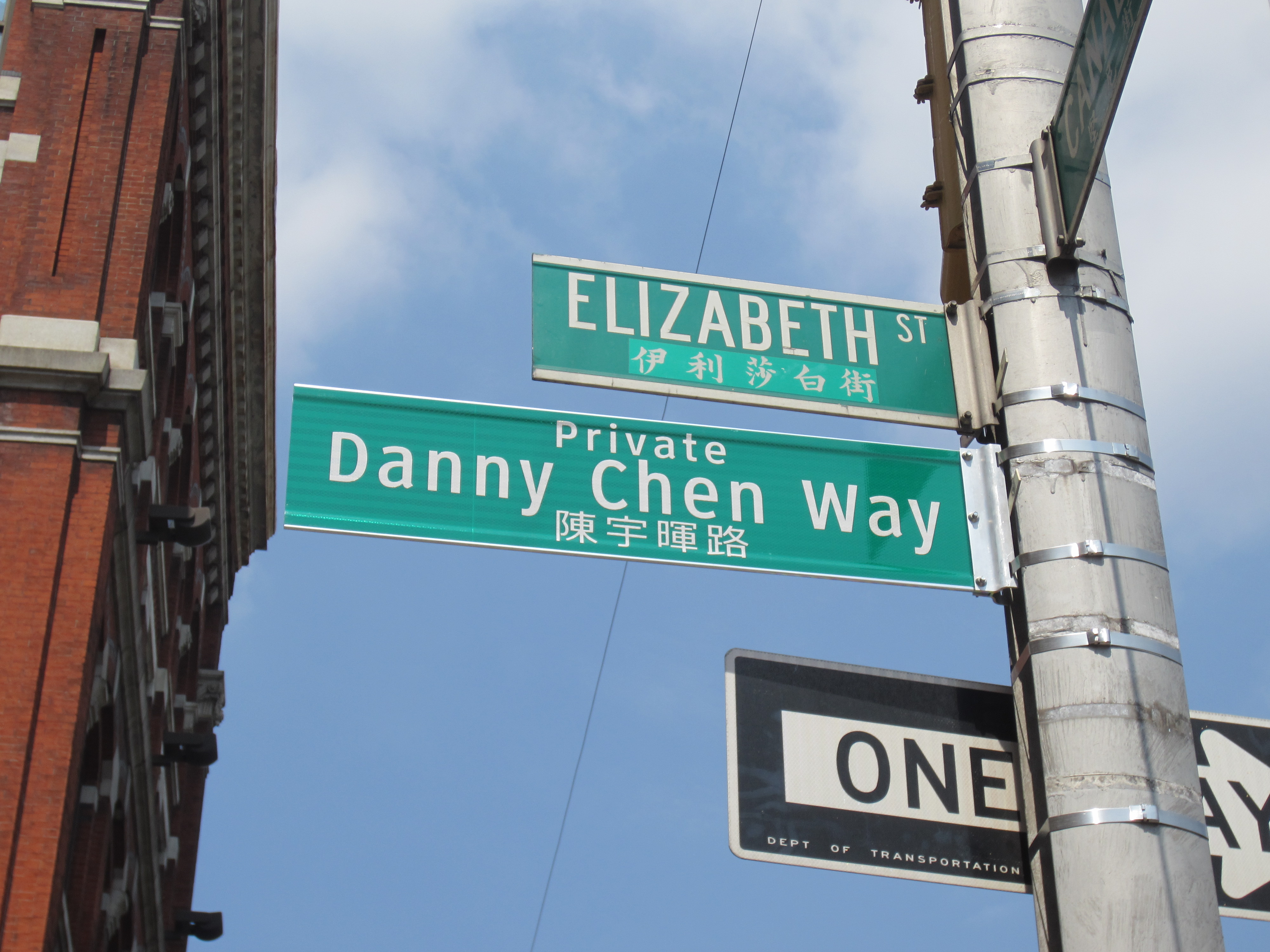
Elizabeth Street, co-named Pvt. Danny Chen Way

Streets in Chinatown also have Chinese names, which are noted on bilingual street signs in Chinatown. Prior to the 1960s, Chinatown residents named the streets informally, and streets could carry several Chinese names. The first bilingual street signs installed by the city government were placed on police call boxes in 1966. The first 44 bilingual street signs, displaying the street name in English with a smaller street name in Chinese below, were installed in 1969. These signs were installed in an area bounded by Canal Street to the north, Bowery to the east, Chatham Square to the southeast, Worth Street to the south, and Mulberry Street to the west. The street names were selected to match phonetic transliterations of English names in Taishanese and Cantonese, the two Chinese varieties most frequently spoken in Chinatown at the time. As different Chinese varieties may have widely varying pronunciations for the same word, the signs did not account for pronunciations in Mandarin and Fujianese, the varieties spoken by many immigrants who came in the 1970s.

In the early 1980s, the program was expanded following an effort by urban planner Jerry S. Y. Cheng and Chinese Consolidated Benevolent Association (CCBA) president Li Boli. The New York City Department of Transportation commissioned a study in 1985 to identify places for new signs, but most records have been lost or destroyed. The expansion would have extended the signs north to Broome Street, east to Allen and Pike Streets, southeast to Madison Street (between Oliver and Pike Streets), and west to Lafayette Street. The newer street names were proposed by CCBA members and affiliated merchants, who mostly spoke Taishanese and Cantonese. Calligrapher Tan Bingzhong manually wrote the Chinese characters on street signs for 40 streets, leading to slight variations in each sign.

While there were 155 street signs at the program's peak, only 101 signs remained as of 2022, and almost half of the 40 streets no longer have bilingual signs. A New York Times analysis of the program found that many damaged signs were replaced with English-only signs, as translated street names are not part of the Manual on Uniform Traffic Control Devices, or else were not replaced at all. Furthermore, many of the people involved in the street-sign programs during the 1960s and 1980s had died, and the relocation of the neighborhood's Chinese residents had shrunken the area's Chinese presence over time. According to the Times, there was little awareness in the neighborhood that the bilingual signs were disappearing, even among community leaders.

| Street | Traditional Chinese | Mandarin Pinyin | Cantonese Jyutping |
|---|---|---|---|
| Allen Street | 亞倫街 | Yǎlún Jiē | Aa3 leon4 Gaai1 |
| Baxter Street | 巴士特街 | Bāshìtè Jiē | Baa1 si6 dak6 Gaai1 |
| Bayard Street | 擺也街 | Bǎiyě Jiē | Baai2 jaa5 Gaai1 |
| Bowery | 包厘街 | Bāolí Jiē | Baau1 lei4 Gaai1 |
| Broadway | 百老匯大道 | Bǎilǎohuì Dàdào | Baak3 lou5 wui6 Daai6 dou6 |
| Broome Street | 布隆街 | Bùlóng Jiē | Bou3 lung4 Gaai1 |
| Canal Street | 堅尼街 | Jiānní Jiē | Gin1 nei4 Gaai1 |
| Catherine Street | 加薩林街 | Jiāsàlín Jiē | Gaa1 saat3 lam4 Gaai1 |
| Centre Street | 中央街 | Zhōngyāng Jiē | Zung1 joeng1 Gaai1 |
| Chambers Street | 錢伯斯街 | Qiánbósī Jiē | Cin2 baak3 si1 Gaai1 |
| Chatham Square | 且林士果 | Qiělín Shìguǒ | Ce2 lam4 Si6 gwo2 |
| Cherry Street | 車厘街 | Chēlí Jiē | Ce1 lei4 Gaai1 |
| Chrystie Street | 企李士提街 | Qǐlǐshìtí Jiē | Kei5 lei5 si6 tai4 Gaai1 |
| Delancey Street | 地蘭西街 | Dìlánxī Jiē | Dei6 laan4 sai1 Gaai1 |
| Division Street | 地威臣街 | Dìwēichén Jiē | Dei6 wai1 san4 Gaai1 |
| Doyers Street | 宰也街 | Zǎiyě Jiē | Zoi2 jaa5 Gaai1 |
| East Broadway (Little Fuzhou) | 東百老匯 (小福州) | Dōng Bǎilǎohuì (Xiǎo Fúzhōu) | Dung1 Baak3 lou5 wui6 (Siu2 Fuk1 zau1) |
| Eldridge Street | 愛烈治街 | Àilièzhì Jiē | Oi3 lit6 zi6 Gaai1 |
| Elizabeth Street (Private Danny Chen Way) | 伊利莎白街 (陳宇暉路) | Yīlìshābái Jiē (Chén Yǔhuī Lù) | Ji1 lei6 saa1 baak6 Gaai1 (Can4 Jyu5 fai1 Lou6) |
| Forsyth Street | 科西街 | Kēxī Jiē | Fo1 sai1 Gaai1 |
| Grand Street | 格蘭街 | Gélán Jiē | Gaak3 laan4 Gaai1 |
| Henry Street | 顯利街 | Xiǎnlì Jiē | Hin2 lei6 Gaai1 |
| Hester Street | 喜士打街 | Xǐshìdǎ Jiē | Hei2 si6 daa2 Gaai1 |
| Ludlow Street | 拉德洛街 | Lādéluò Jiē | Laai1 dak1 lok6 Gaai1 |
| Madison Street | 麥地遜街 | Màidìxùn Jiē | Mak6 dei6 seon3 Gaai1 |
| Market Street | 市場街 | Shìchǎng Jiē | Si5 coeng4 Gaai1 |
| Monroe Street | 門羅街 | Ménluó Jiē | Mun4 lo4 Gaai1 |
| Mosco Street | 莫斯科街 | Mòsīkē Jiē | Mok6 si1 fo1 Gaai1 |
| Mott Street (Little Hong Kong, Little Guangdong) | 勿街 (小香港, 小廣東) | Wù Jiē (Xiǎo Xiānggǎng, Xiǎo Guǎngdōng) | Mat6 Gaai1 (Siu2 Hoeng1 gong2, Siu2 Gwong2 dung1) |
| Mulberry Street | 摩比利街 | Móbǐlì Jiē | Mo1 bei2 lei6 Gaai1 |
| Orchard Street | 柯察街 | Kēchá Jiē | O1 caat3 Gaai1 |
| Park Row | 柏路 | Bǎi Lù | Paak3 Lou6 |
| Pell Street | 披露街 | Pīlù Jiē | Pei1 lou6 Gaai1 |
| Pike Street | 派街 | Pài Jiē | Paai3 Gaai1 |
| Rutgers Street | 羅格斯街 | Luógésī Jiē | Lo4 gaak3 si1 Gaai1 |
| South Street | 南街 | Nán Jiē | Naam4 Gaai1 |
| Water Street | 水街 | Shuǐ Jiē | Seoi2 Gaai1 |
| Worth Street | 窩夫街 | Wōfū Jiē | Wo1 fu1 Gaai1 |
| White Street | 白街 | Bái Jiē | Baak6 Gaai1 |

== See also ==
- Chinatowns in the United States
- Chinese people in New York City
- Chinatowns in the Americas#New York City
- Other Chinatowns in NYC:
  - Little Fuzhou
  - Chinatowns in Queens:
    - Chinatown, Flushing
    - Chinatown, Elmhurst
    - Corona, Queens
    - Whitestone, Queens
    - Long Island City
  - Chinatowns in Brooklyn:
    - Chinatown, Brooklyn
    - Chinatown, Avenue U
    - Chinatown, Bensonhurst
  - New Dorp, Staten Island
