= Pearl River Mart =

Asian American retail brand, established 1971

Coordinates: 40.7182°N 74.0028°W

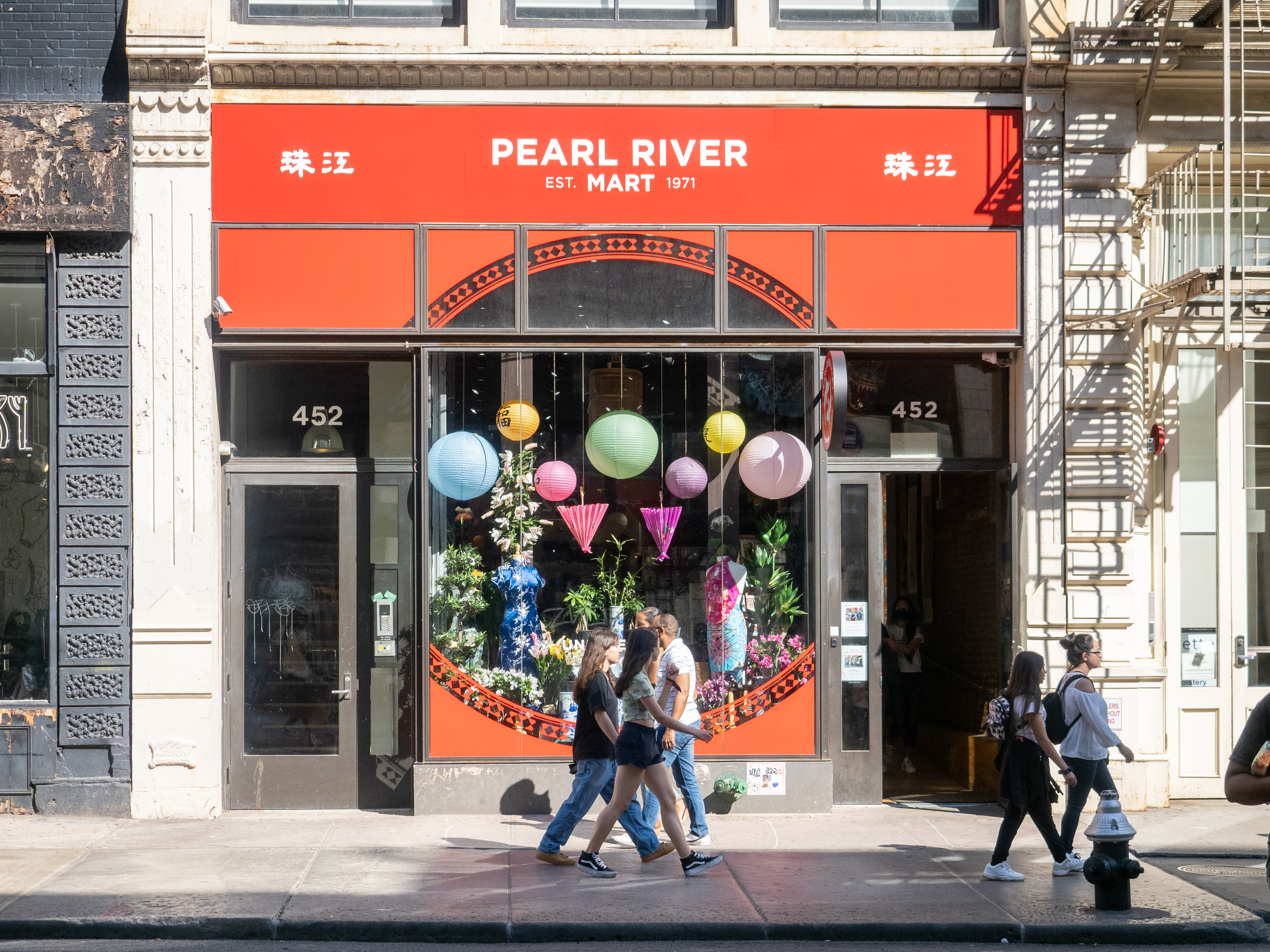
- (2022)
- Company type: Private
- Industry: Retail
- Founded: September 1971; 53 years ago in New York City, United States
- Founder: Ming Yi Chen
- Headquarters: 452 Broadway, New York City, United States
- Key people: Joanne Kwong (President)
- Website: pearlriver.com

Pearl River Mart is an Asian-American retail brand and family-run business in New York City. The business was founded in 1971 in Chinatown, Manhattan, as Chinese Native Products by Ming Yi Chen and a group of student activists from China, Hong Kong, and Taiwan. Chen has said that he and his colleagues "wanted to create a small window into the Chinese culture". Its products include braided straw slippers, paper lanterns, cheongsams, cotton Mary Janes, and copies of Mao's Little Red Book. Pearl River Mart has become a New York City institution. The business has an art gallery in its main location, and hosts in-store events and performances.

== History ==
Pearl River Mart was founded in 1971 by Ming Yi Chen and a group of activists from China, Hong Kong, and Taiwan. Diplomatic relations between the United States and China were frozen at the time, and trade was banned due to the Cold War. The founders hoped that the store would improve cultural understanding of China. When trade relations were restored, Pearl River Mart was an early recipient of Chinese goods. The store has occupied various locations since its founding, including a 30,000-square-foot (2,800 m^{2}) location at Broadway and Broome Street in SoHo, Manhattan, described as a "department store".

In March 2016, Pearl River Mart closed due to increasing rent. It re-opened in November 2016 under the leadership of Joanne Kwong, the Chens' daughter-in-law, who graduated from Columbia University and worked as an attorney, a professor at Fordham University School of Law, and VP of communications at Barnard College. In November 2017, the store expanded with a second location in Chelsea Market; a third location opened at the Museum of Chinese in America in January 2019.

In October 2020, the business expanded "within Chelsea Market ... with the addition of Pearl Mart Foods". In addition to a grocery, the location houses three vendors: Mao's Bao, Kimbap Lab, and Tea and Milk.

On April 4, 2021, their main location at 395 Broadway closed "after a dispute with the landlord". On May 1, 2021, their main location reopened at 452 Broadway.

Pearl River Mart has been involved with local community efforts, including a fund drive to procure and donate KN95 masks and other PPE to frontline workers during a time PPE was difficult to obtain, and a lantern installation throughout Manhattan Chinatown with the purpose of increasing foot traffic, improving business, and making residents feel safe.

Pearl River Mart has collaborated with several Asian-American designers and entrepreneurs. In June 2022, the business expanded their fashion line with a capsule that put "a fresh and modern take on traditional Chinese garments". It also has an art gallery, which showcases the work of Asian and Asian-American artists; featured artists have included Arlan Huang, Corky Lee, Chinatown Art Brigade, and Yumi Sakugawa. Artists Space and the Smithsonian Asian Pacific American Center have been guest curators. Recent art exhibitions have included companion exhibitions in Chelsea Market.

== See also ==
- Chinese in New York City
- List of museums and cultural institutions in New York City
