= Stephanie H. Shih =

Taiwanese American ceramic artist

Stephanie H. Shih (Chinese: 石函玉) is a Taiwanese American ceramic artist, who makes sculptures that resemble popular traditional and mass-produced pantry items that are found in many Asian-American homes.

== Biography ==
Shih was born and raised in New Jersey to parents who had emigrated from Taiwan. Prior to beginning her art career, Shih had been working as a copywriter. She started to throw and sculpt in clay as a therapeutic way to manage chronic pain. Since 2009, she has been living and working in Brooklyn.

== Artwork ==
Shih’s ceramic sculptures represent a reflection of Asian Diaspora culture, through food items that have been created or adapted by Asian communities in Western countries.

Her work in clay began with pottery inspired by Chinese Qing and Song dynasties. Thereafter, she started to create hand-folded porcelain dumplings. Shih has since created over one-thousand ceramic dumplings. These dumplings are vessels that hold significant emotional memories. Shih began making real pork-filled dumplings at an early age with her family and recognized their culinary significance.

In 2018, Shih created a group of life-sized food items rendered in clay, which she titled “Oriental Grocery.” Some of the sculptures in the series include a sriracha bottle, Chinkiang black vinegar, Lao Gan Ma chili sauce, a box of Pocky, Chapagetti noodles, and a 50lb bag of Botan rice. Other food items Shih has sculpted include Kings Hawaiian buns and SPAM, which are products that were introduced to Asian Diasporic communities as a result of the United States’ global militarization and colonial exploitation.

Art critic John Yau states that “Shih’s work is both aesthetic and political, a commentary on assimilation as a process in which one’s national origin is not forgotten or erased. This resistance troubles a significant number of Americans. They might go to a Chinese restaurant and open their fortune cookie at the end of the meal, but they don’t like the colorful diversity that the future holds for them.”

== Solo exhibitions ==
- Stephanie H. Shih: Domestic Bliss, Alexander Berggruen, New York, NY, 2025
- Greetings from Gold Mountain, Berggruen Gallery, San Francisco, CA, 2023
- My Sweetie Has No Pockmarks, Syracuse University Art Museum, Syracuse, NY, 2022
- Open Sundays, Harkawik, New York, NY, 2022
- New World Mall, Stanley’s, Los Angeles, 2021
- Same Same, Perrotin Editions, New York, NY, 2020
- 叚/家: Nostalgia for a Nonexistent Homeland, Wieden+Kennedy Gallery, Portland, OR, 2019
- A Strong Tide and Other Homes, Duke Riley Studio, Brooklyn, NY, 2017
