= New Fuzhou =

New Fuzhou may refer to:

- Little Fuzhou, a neighborhood in New York City
- Sibu, a town in Malaysia

== See also ==
- Fuzhou (disambiguation)
