= Chinatowns in the Americas =

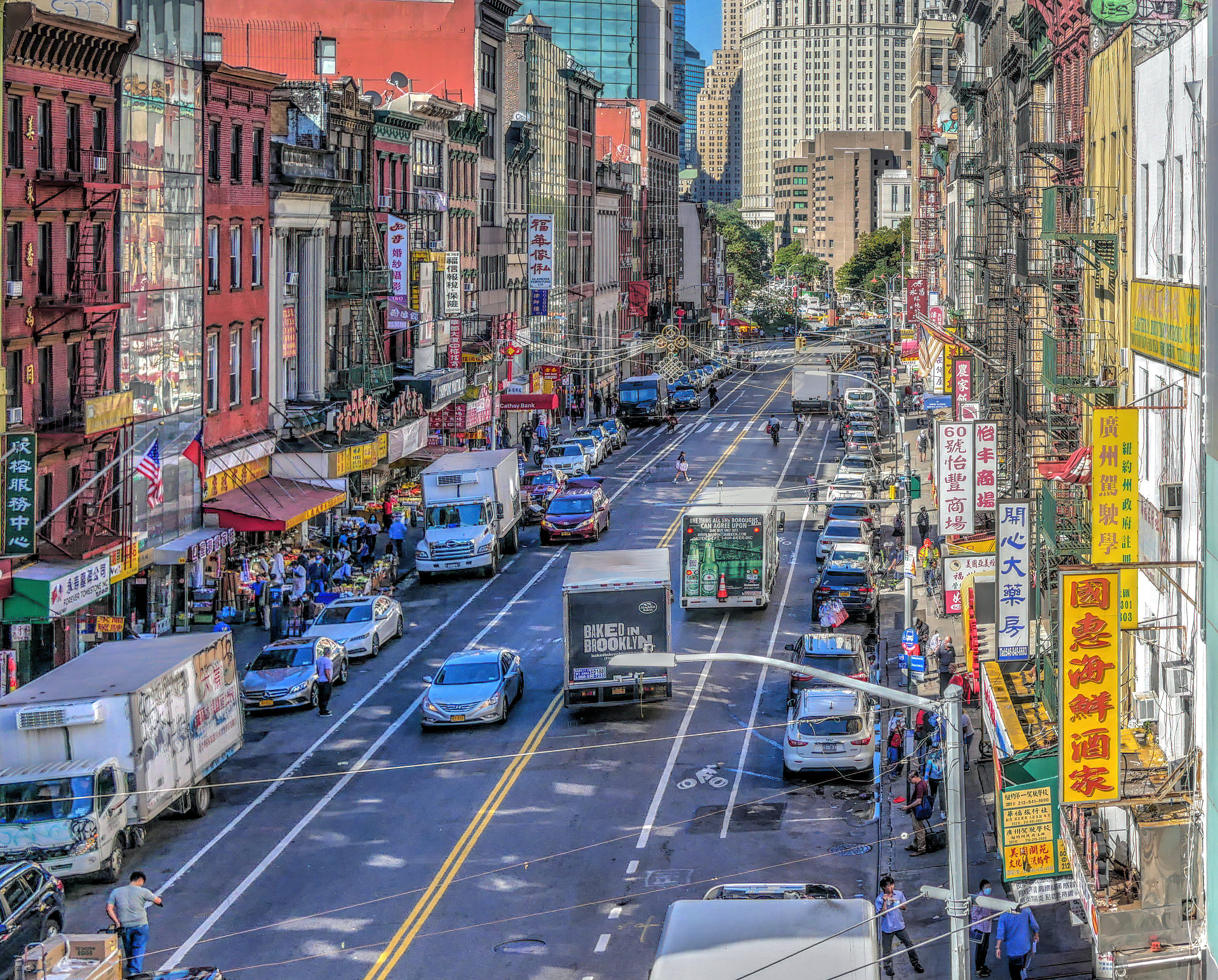
- Chinatown, Manhattan, the highest concentration of Chinese people outside Asia.
- Chinese: 唐人街
- Literal meaning: "Chinese Street"
Transcriptions
Standard Mandarin
- Hanyu Pinyin: Tángrénjiē
Wu
- Romanization: Daon^{平} nin^{平} ka^{平}
Yue: Cantonese
- Yale Romanization: Tòhngyàhngāai
- Jyutping: Tong^{2} jan^{2} gaai^{1}
Southern Min
- Hokkien POJ: Tông-jîn-ke
Eastern Min
- Fuzhou BUC: Tòng-ìng-kĕ

Alternative Chinese name
- Traditional Chinese: 中國城
- Simplified Chinese: 中国城
- Literal meaning: "Chinatown"
Transcriptions
Standard Mandarin
- Hanyu Pinyin: Zhōngguóchéng
Wu
- Romanization: Tson^{平} koh^{入} zen^{平}
Yue: Cantonese
- Yale Romanization: Jūnggwoksìhng
- Jyutping: Jung^{1} gwok^{3} sing^{4}
Southern Min
- Hokkien POJ: Tiong-kok-siânn
Eastern Min
- Fuzhou BUC: Dŭng-guók-siàng

Second alternative Chinese name
- Traditional Chinese: 華埠
- Simplified Chinese: 华埠
- Literal meaning: "Chinese District"
Transcriptions
Standard Mandarin
- Hanyu Pinyin: Huábù
Wu
- Romanization: Gho^{平} bu^{去}
Yue: Cantonese
- Yale Romanization: Wàhfauh
- Jyutping: Wa^{4} fau^{6}
Southern Min
- Hokkien POJ: Hôa-bú
Eastern Min
- Fuzhou BUC: Huà-pú

This article discusses Chinatowns in the Americas, urban areas with a large population of people of Chinese descent. The regions include: Canada, the United States, and Latin America.

== Locations ==
=== Canada ===
Chinatowns in Canada generally exist in the large cities. Calgary, Edmonton, Montreal, Ottawa, Regina, Toronto, Vancouver, Victoria, Windsor, and Winnipeg have Chinatowns.

Chinatowns have existed in some smaller towns throughout the history of Canada. Prior to 1900, almost all Chinese were located in British Columbia, in towns such as Nanaimo, New Westminster, Mission, Lillooet, Barkerville, and Penticton. Some British Columbia towns that were majority Chinese for years, such as Stanley, Rock Creek, and Richfield were not known as Chinatowns.

From 1923 to 1967, immigration from China was suspended due to exclusion laws. In 1997, the handover of Hong Kong to China caused many from there to flee to Canada due to uncertainties. According to an article from the Globe and Mail, Canada had 25 Chinatowns total across the entire country between the 1930s to 1940s, some of which had become extinct.

==== Vancouver ====
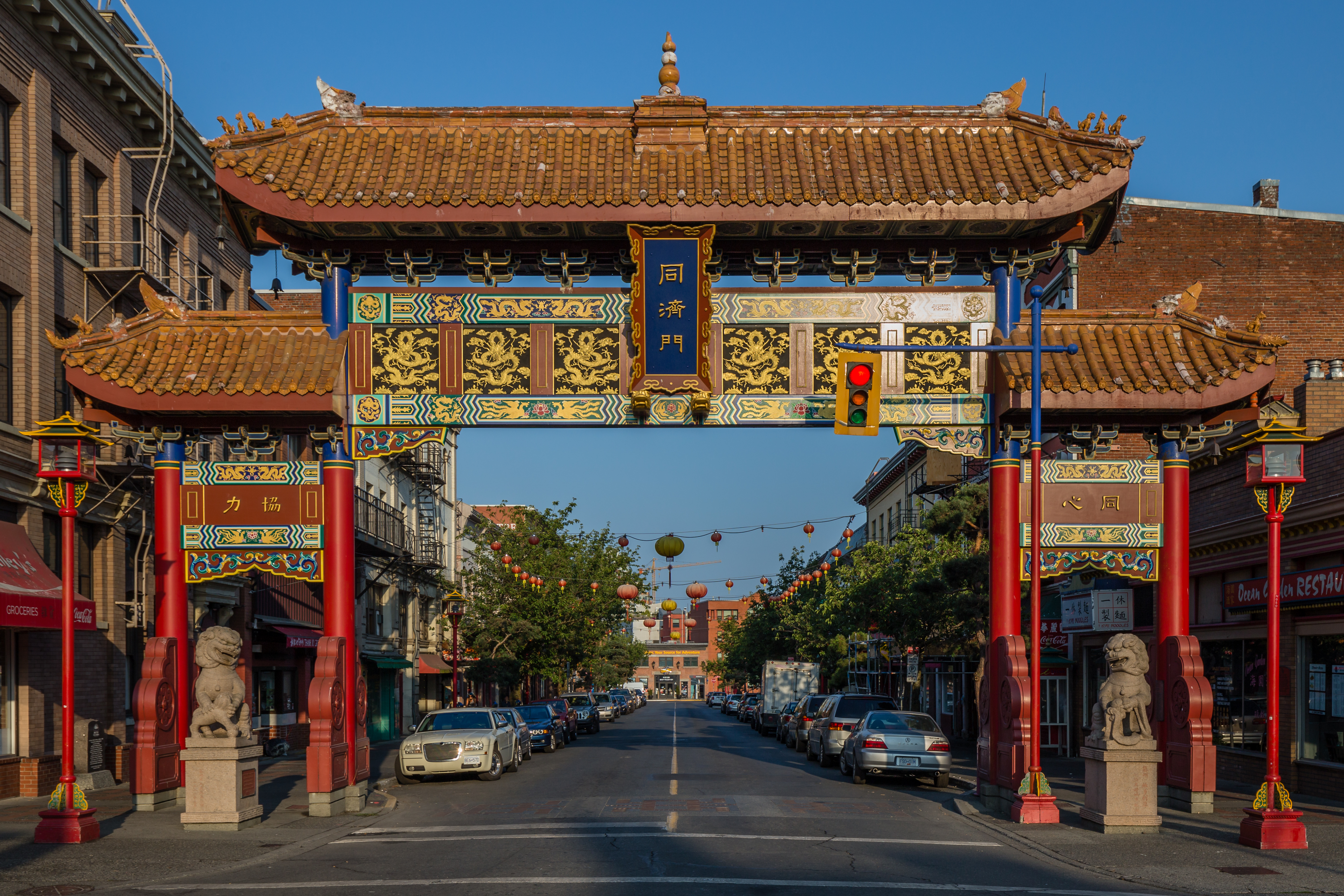
Entrance to Victoria's Chinatown in British Columbia

Vancouver's Chinatown is the largest in Canada. Dating back to the late 19th century, the main focus of the older Chinatown is Pender Street and Main Street in downtown Vancouver, which is also, along with Victoria's Chinatown, one of the oldest surviving Chinatowns in North America. Vancouver has been the setting for a variety of modern Chinese Canadian culture and literature. Vancouver's Chinatown contains numerous galleries, shops, restaurants, and markets, in addition to the Chinese Cultural Centre and the Dr. Sun Yat Sen Classical Chinese Garden and park; the garden is the first and one of the largest Ming era-style Chinese gardens outside China. Although only one neighborhood is designated as Chinatown in modern Greater Vancouver, the high proportion of Chinese people living in the region (the highest in North America) has created many commercial and residential areas that while Chinese-dominated are not called "Chinatown". In Greater Vancouver that term refers only to the historic Chinatown in the city core. There is an abundance of Chinese- and Asian-themed malls in the region, with the highest concentration in the Golden Village district of Richmond.

=== United States ===
Chinatowns in the United States of America have existed since the 1840s on the West Coast and the 1870s on the East Coast. The Chinese were one of the first Asian groups to arrive in large numbers. Circumstances caused by the Korean and Vietnam wars, the 1965 Immigration Act, in addition to the desire for skilled workers caused more immigration from China and the rest of Asia. As of the early 21st century the Chinese are the largest of the Asian immigrant groups; and have been so for most of the history of the United States. As other immigrants of other countries arrive, Chinatown, the oldest of the Asian ethnic enclaves has become a pattern for other Asian enclaves such as Japantown, Koreatown, and Little India. The Flushing Chinatown in New York City is now home to the largest Chinese population outside of Asia, while the Chinatown in San Francisco is the oldest in the United States.

==== New York City ====
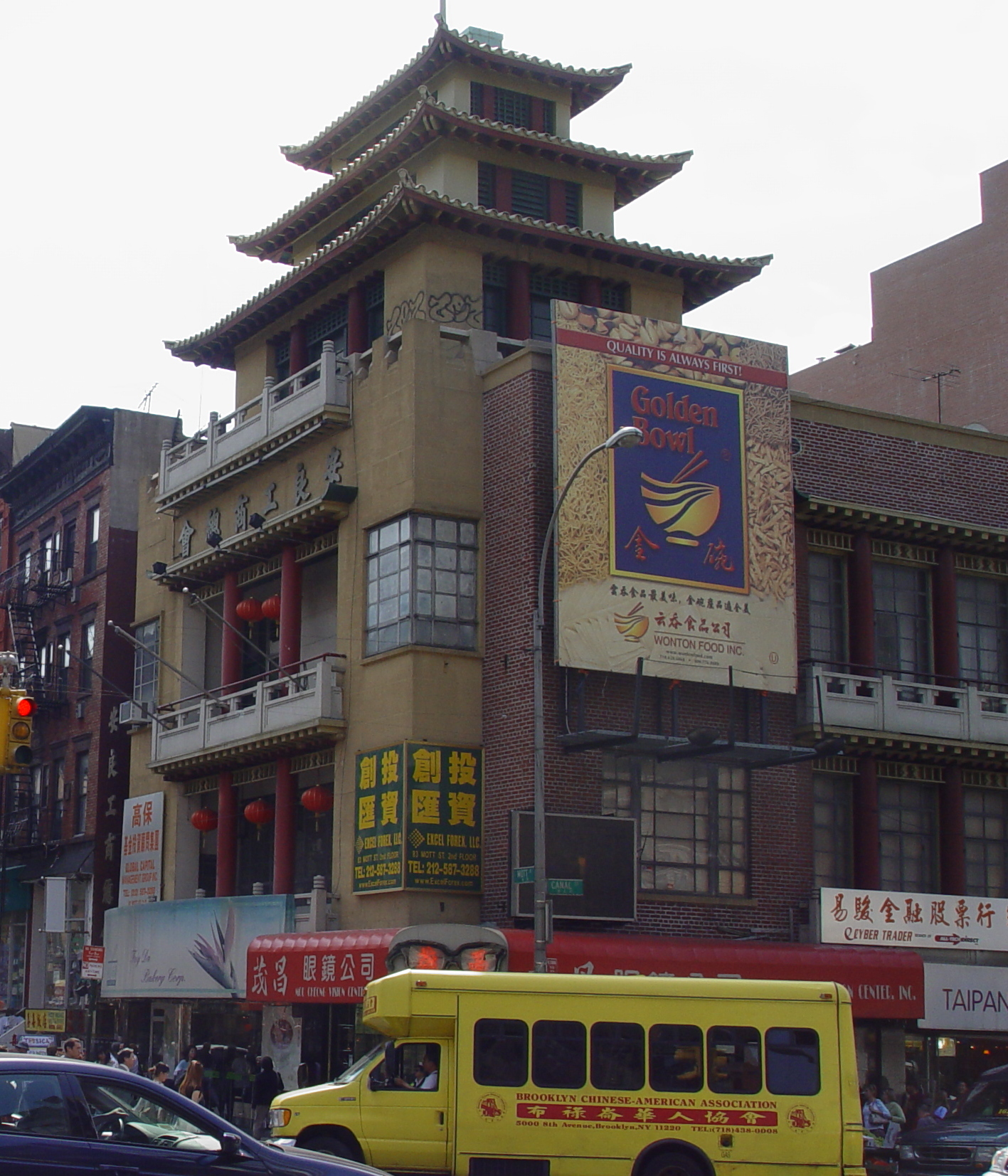
On Leong building in Chinatown, Manhattan

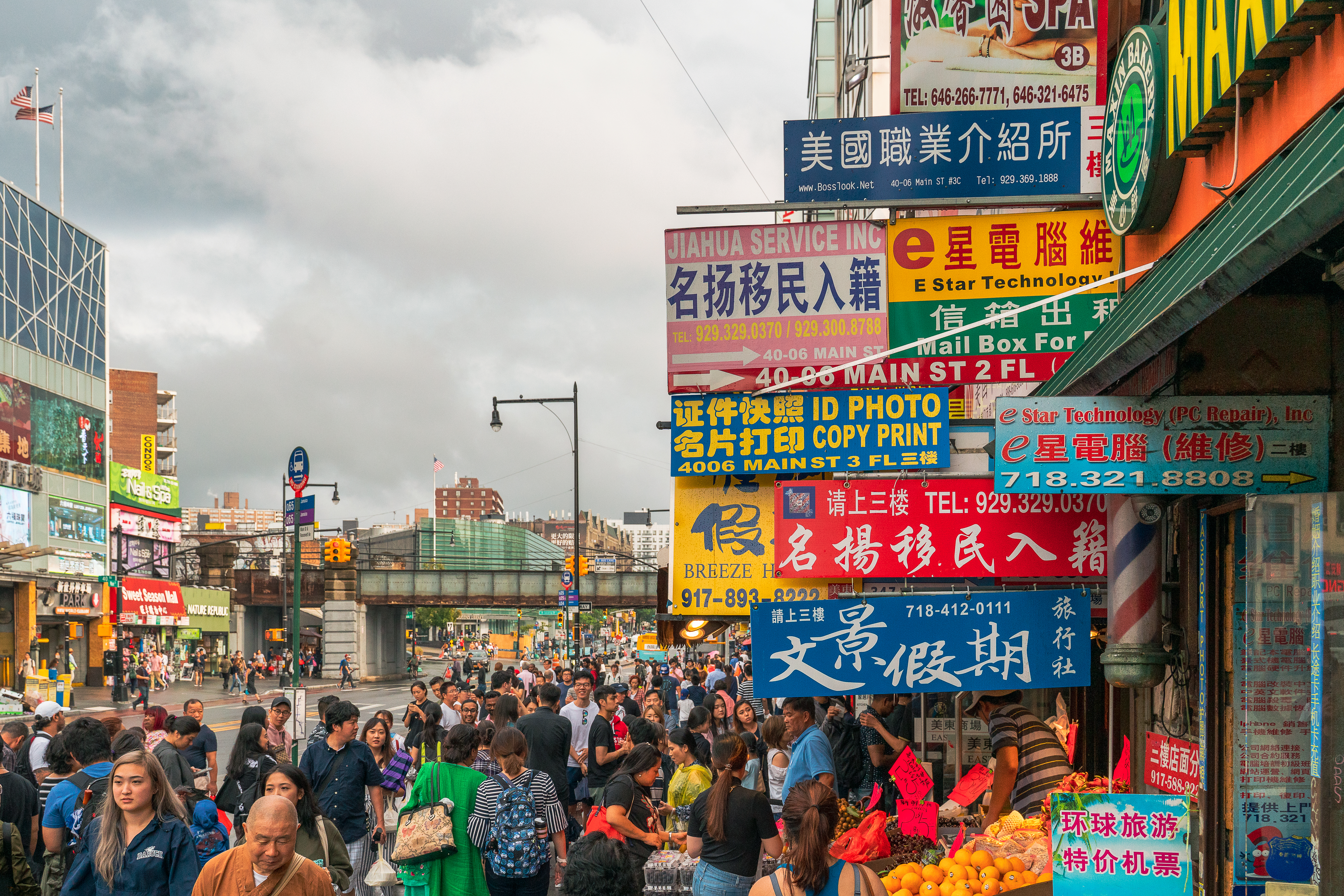
Intersection of Main Street and Roosevelt Avenue in Flushing, home to the world's largest Chinatown

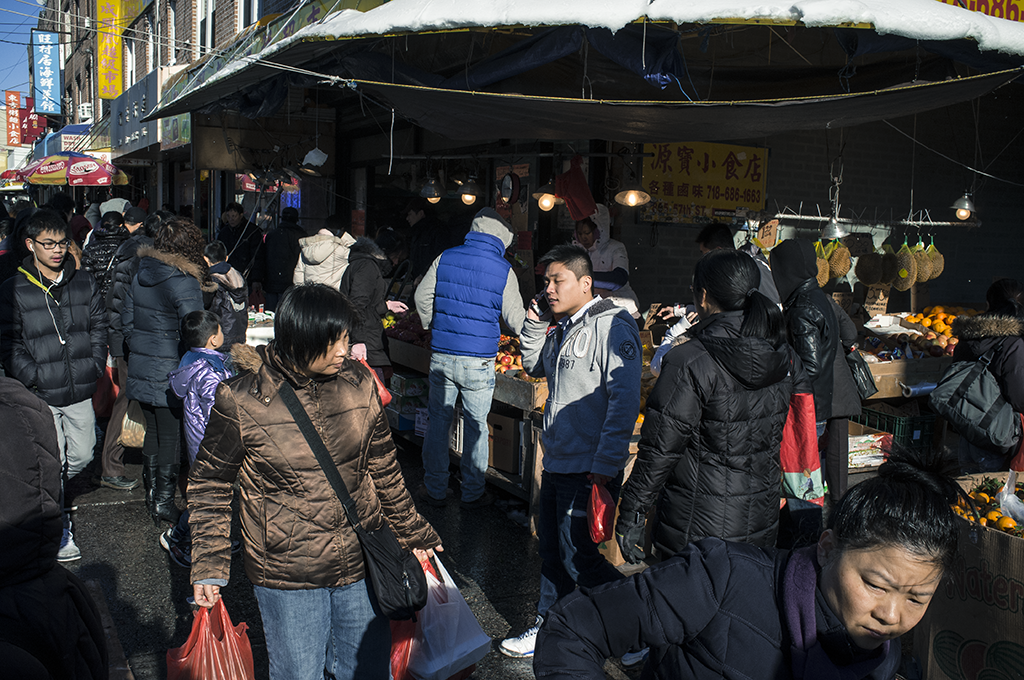
Eighth Avenue, Brooklyn Chinatown

The New York metropolitan area contains the largest ethnic Chinese population outside of Asia, comprising an estimated 893,697 uniracial individuals as of 2017, including at least 12 Chinatowns - six (or nine, including the emerging Chinatowns in Corona and Whitestone, Queens, and East Harlem, Manhattan) in New York City proper, and one each in Nassau County, Long Island; Edison, New Jersey; and Parsippany-Troy Hills, New Jersey, not to mention fledgling ethnic Chinese enclaves emerging throughout the New York City metropolitan area. Chinese Americans, as a whole, have had a (relatively) long tenure in New York City. The Manhattan Chinatown is home to the highest concentration of Chinese people in the Western Hemisphere.

The first Chinese immigrants came to Lower Manhattan around 1870, looking for the "golden" opportunities America had to offer. By 1880, the enclave around Five Points was estimated to have from 200 to as many as 1,100 members. However, the Chinese Exclusion Act, which went into effect in 1882, caused an abrupt decline in the number of Chinese who immigrated to New York and the rest of the United States. Later, in 1943, the Chinese were given a small quota, and the community's population gradually increased until 1968, when the quota was lifted and the Chinese American population skyrocketed. In the past few years, the Cantonese dialect that has dominated Chinatown for decades is being rapidly swept aside by Mandarin Chinese, the national language of China and the lingua franca of most of the latest Chinese immigrants. While the Flushing Chinatown in Queens has become one of the largest Chinatowns in the world and one of the world's busiest pedestrian intersections, it has also become the epicenter of organized prostitution in the United States. Flushing is undergoing rapid gentrification by Chinese transnational entities. The growth of the business activity at the core of Downtown Flushing, dominated by the Flushing Chinatown, has continued despite the COVID-19 pandemic.

==== San Francisco ====
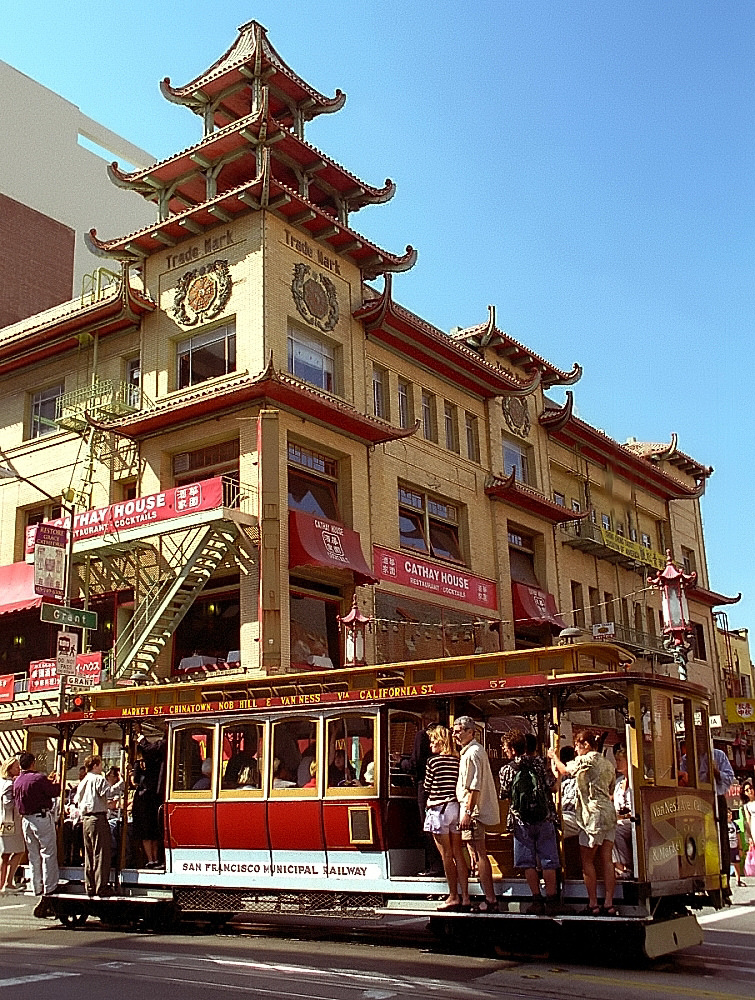
Sing Chong building in Chinatown, San Francisco with a California Street cable car

A Pacific port city, San Francisco has the oldest and longest continuous running Chinatown in the Western Hemisphere. It originated circa 1848 and served as a gateway for incoming immigrants who arrived during the California gold rush and the construction of the North American transcontinental railroads. Chinatown was later reconceptualized as a tourist attraction in 1910.

San Francisco's Chinatown was almost completely destroyed by the 1906 earthquake and fire, but some of its inhabitants did not relocate elsewhere. Looming large were proposals by real estate speculators and politicians to expand the Financial District's influence into the area, by displacing the Chinese community to the southern part of the city. In response, many of Chinatown's residents and landlords defiantly stayed behind to stake their neighborhood's claim, sleeping out in the open and in makeshift tents. Numerous businesses and housing based in brick buildings survived with moderate damage and continued functioning, if only in a limited capacity. In just two years after the earthquake, the landmark Sing Fat and Sing Chong buildings were completed as a statement of the Chinese community's resolve to remain in the area. As a result of this action, Chinatown remains the longest, continuously occupied Chinese community outside of Asia.

Still a community of predominantly Taishanese-speaking inhabitants, San Francisco's Chinatown became one of the most important Chinese centers in the United States.

=== Latin America ===
Chinatowns in Latin America (Spanish: barrios chinos, singular barrio chino / Portuguese: bairros chineses, singular bairro chinês) developed with the rise of Chinese immigration in the 19th century to various countries in Latin America as contract laborers (i.e., indentured servants) in agricultural and fishing industries. Most came from Guangdong Province. Since the 1970s, the new arrivals have typically hailed from Hong Kong, Macau, and Taiwan. Latin American Chinatowns may include the descendants of original migrants — often of mixed Chinese and Latino parentage — and more recent immigrants from East Asia. Most Asian Latin Americans are of Cantonese and Hakka origin. Estimates widely vary on the number of Chinese descendants in Latin America. The oldest Chinatown in Latin America is in Mexico City, dating back to at least the early 17th century. Two notable Chinatowns exist in Lima, Peru.

In Brazil, the Liberdade neighborhood in São Paulo has, along with a large Japanese community, an important Chinese community. There is a project for a Chinatown in the Mercado neighborhood, close to the Municipal Market and the commercial Rua 25 de Março.

Latin American Chinatowns
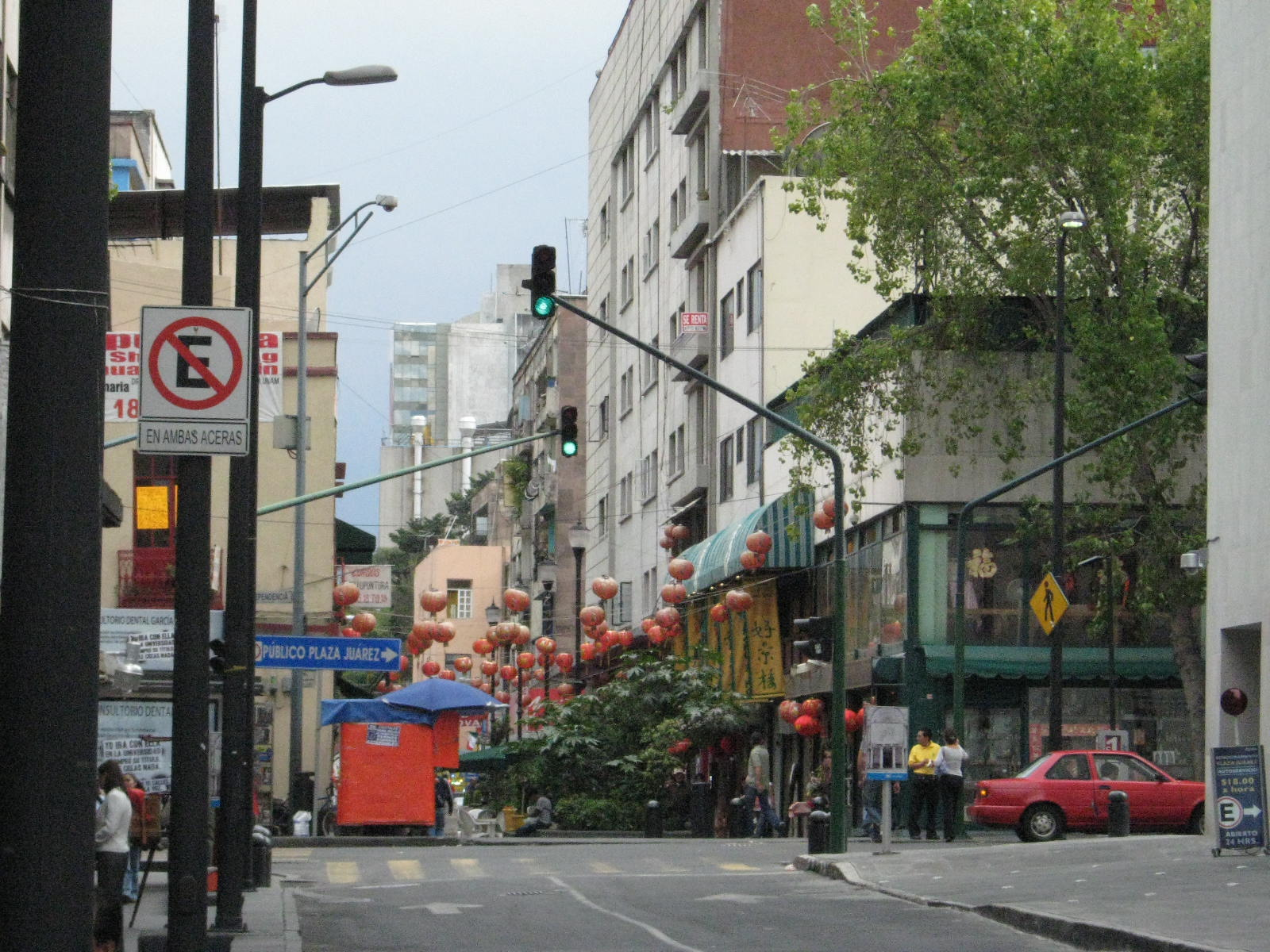
Entering Barrio Chino on Dolores Street

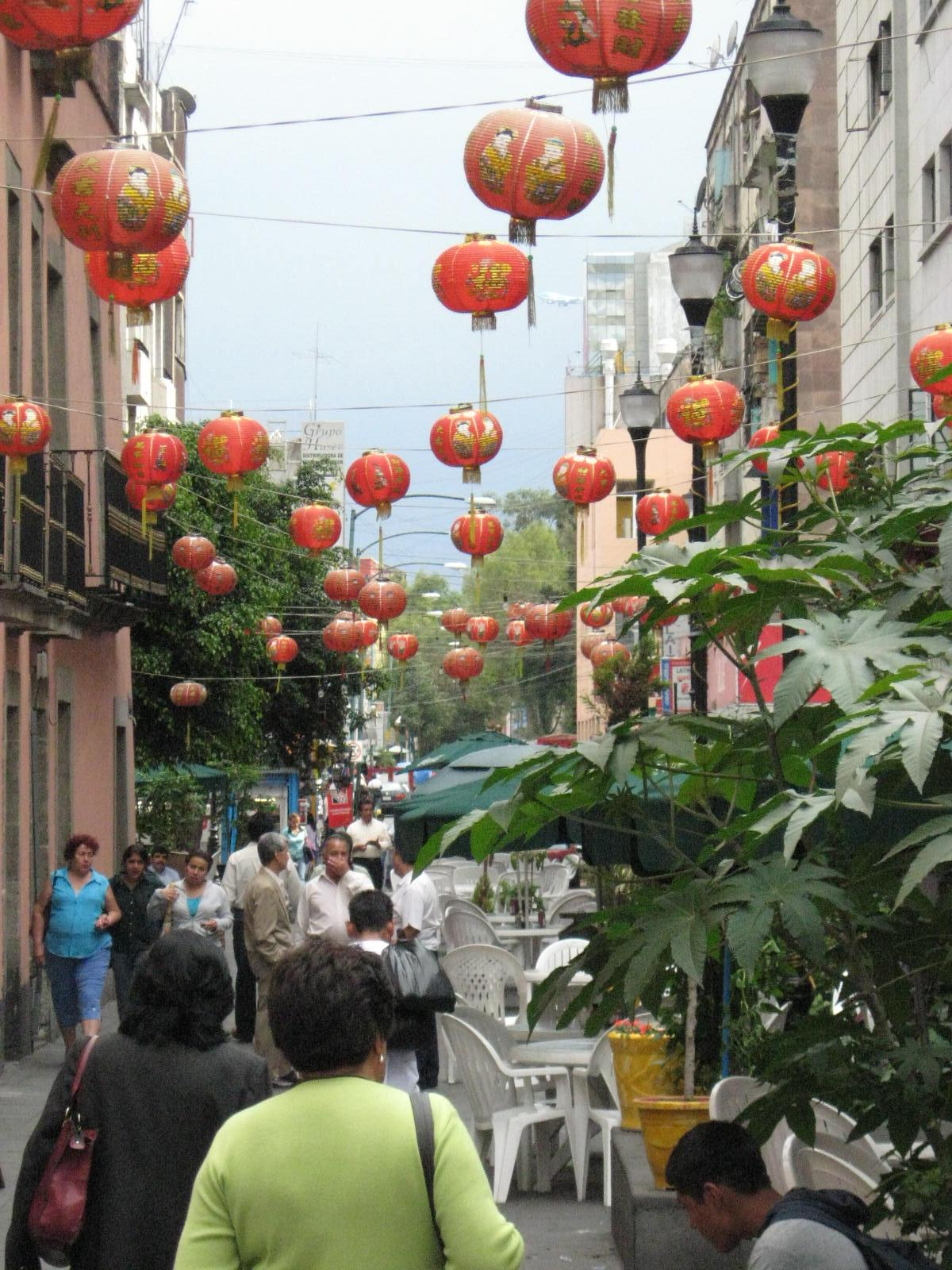
Dolores Street in Barrio Chino

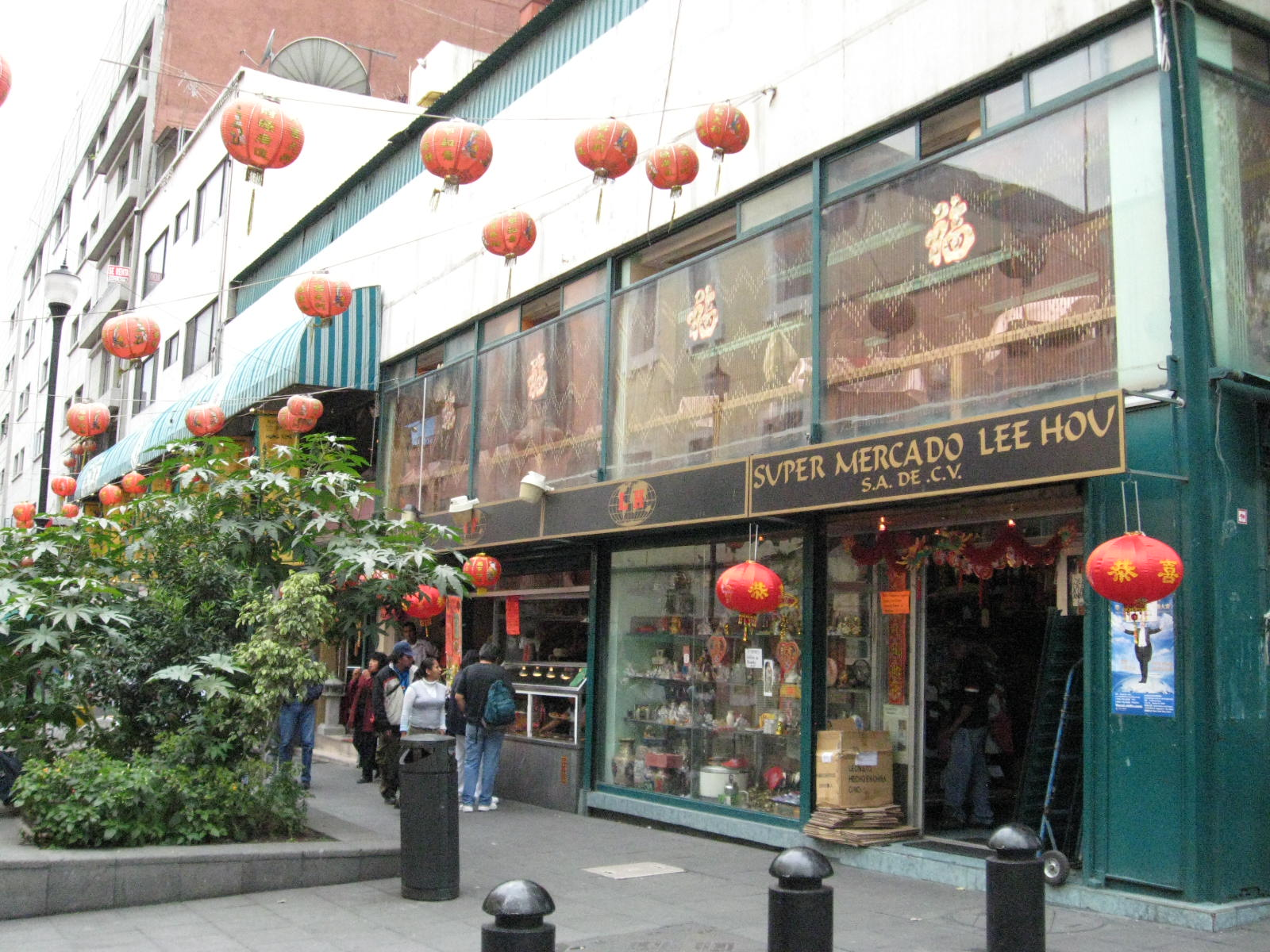
Asian food supermarket on Dolores Street

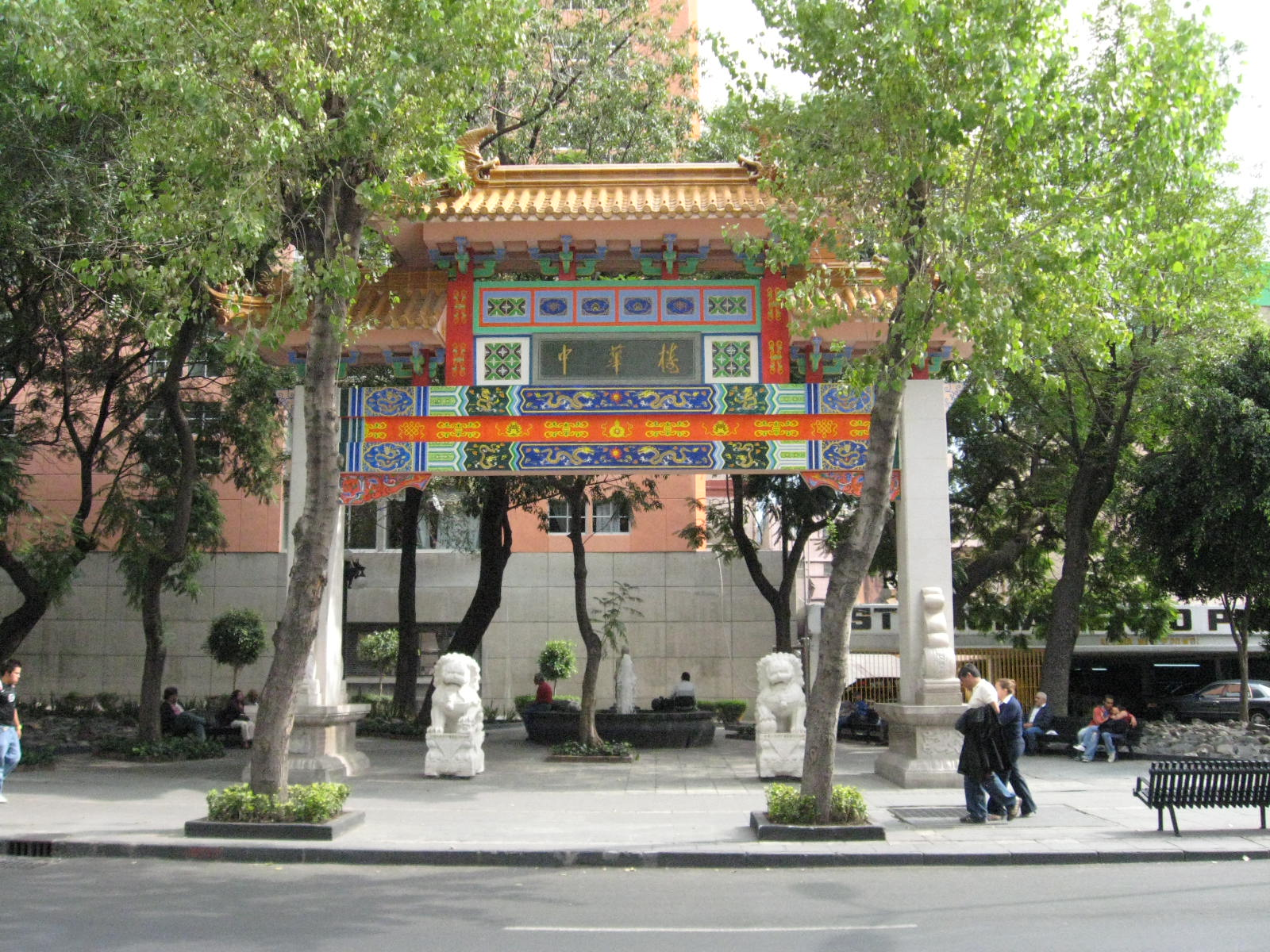
Arch honors Chinese-Mexican community of Mexico City, built in 2008, Articulo 123 Street

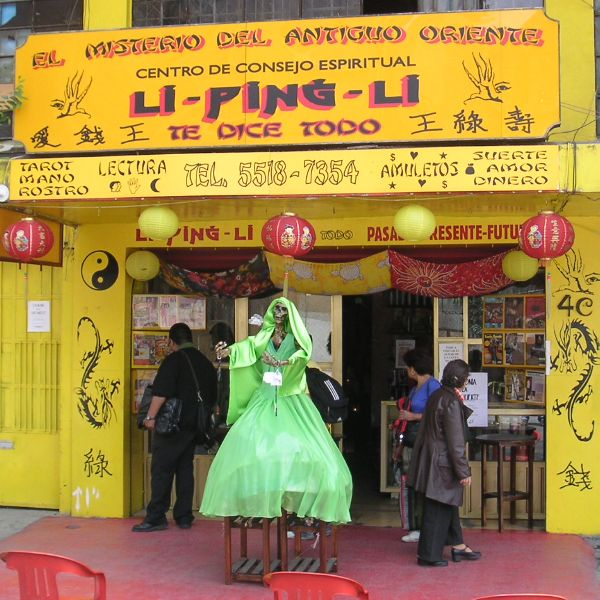
Store in Barrio Chino, Mexico City
