= Fuzhou (disambiguation) =

Fuzhou (福州市 or romanized Foochow,) is the capital city in Fujian, China.

Fuzhou may also refer to:

- Fuzhou, Jiangxi (抚州), a city in Jiangxi, China
- Fuzhoucheng (复州城), a town in Wafangdian, Liaoning, China
- Fuzhou (復州), a former prefecture in roughly modern Xiantao, Hubei, China
- Fuzhou (福州), a former prefecture in roughly modern Nandan County, Guangxi, China
- Fuzhou (福州), a former prefecture in roughly modern Guangnan County, Yunnan, China
- Fuzhou (福州), a former prefecture in roughly modern Horqin Left Back Banner, Inner Mongolia, China
- Fuzhou (撫州), a former prefecture in roughly modern Zhangbei County, Hebei, China
- Fuzhou (富州), a former prefecture in roughly modern Zhaoping County, Guangxi, China
- Fuzhou (富州), a former prefecture in roughly modern Funing County, Yunnan, China
- Fuzhou (富州), a former prefecture in roughly modern Laifeng County, Hubei, China
- Fuzhou (富州), a former prefecture in roughly modern Fengcheng, Jiangxi, China
- Fuzhou (涪州), a former prefecture in roughly modern Hechuan District, Chongqing, China
- Fuzhou (涪州), a former prefecture in roughly modern Fuling District, Chongqing, China
- Fuzhou (府州), a former prefecture in roughly modern Fugu County, Shaanxi, China
- Fuzhou (鄜州), a former prefecture in roughly modern Fu County, Shaanxi, China
- Fuzhou (扶州), a former prefecture in roughly modern Siping, Jilin, China
- Fuzhou (扶州), a former prefecture in roughly modern Songpan County, Sichuan, China
- Fuzhou (扶州), a former prefecture in roughly modern Jiuzhaigou County, Sichuan, China

== See also ==
- Little Fuzhou, Manhattan, New York City, U.S.
- Sibu, Sarawak, Malaysia
- Fuzhou railway station (disambiguation)
- Foochowese (disambiguation)
- Hokchiu (disambiguation)
