= Fuzhounese Americans =

Americans of Fuzhounese birth or descent

福州美國儂 (Hók-ciŭ Mī-guók-nè̤ng) 福州美國人 (Fúzhōu měiguó rén)

Total population
- 150,000 – 300,000 (2016)

Regions with significant populations
- New York City

Languages
- Eastern Min (Hokchew), Standard Mandarin, English

Religion
- Buddhism, Taoism, Syncretism, Christianity, Confucianism, Atheism, etc

Related ethnic groups
- Fuzhou people, Han Chinese, Americans

Fuzhounese Americans, also known as Hokchew Americans or Fuzhou Americans or imprecisely Fujianese, are Chinese American people of Fuzhou descent, in particular from the Changle district. Many Chinese restaurant workers in the United States are from Fuzhou. There are also a number of undocumented Fuzhounese immigrants in the United States who are smuggled in by groups such as snakeheads.

Fuzhounese Americans helped develop the Chinatown bus lines system, which originated as a means to transport restaurant workers from New York City to various parts of the northeastern United States.

Unlike other Chinese Americans and East Asian American groups, Fuzhounese Americans are almost completely concentrated in the U.S. Northeast. The vast majority live in New York City and on Long Island, but some also live in Middlesex and Morris counties in New Jersey; and in the Boston and Philadelphia metropolitan areas.

== Immigration ==
After the lifting of emigration restriction in the 1980s, people began leaving the Fuzhou area. Illegal immigration from Fujian province peaked at around 8,000 per month in June 1992. During the second half of 1992, illegal immigration into the US was about 2500 per month. Migrants were mostly men, but in 1992 around 20–30% of them were women and children. These arrivals were mostly unskilled agricultural workers. About 80% of them were from the Changle District of Fuzhou, with smaller numbers from Lianjiang and Minhou counties, and other places.

== Businesses ==
=== Restaurants ===
Many Chinese restaurant owners and workers are from Fuzhou. Chinatown bus lines originated as a means to transport workers from New York City to various parts of the East Coast, Midwest, and also parts of the southeastern United States. Restaurant owners usually adopted the established American Chinese cuisine, which is somewhat based on Cantonese cuisine, rather than serving Fujian cuisine. These restaurants are usually all-you-can-eat buffets and take-out restaurants.

Through the 1990s, there was a trend of Chinese immigrants, especially of Fujian ancestry, opening Japanese-style restaurants such as sushi restaurants on the East Coast. This has been attributed to overcompetition in the Chinese-style cuisine sector, and because of the higher price point at which the American public pays for Japanese-style cuisine. In such establishments, there has emerged a tendency for the managers to be non-Fuzhounese, but the majority of the other staff to be Fuzhounese. This reflects a control strategy to balance two situations: the obligation to involve family in the operation of the business, and the prevention of collusion between the manager and the staff against the owner.

=== Bus lines ===
A large proportion of these discount intercity bus services in the United States are operated by Fuzhounese Americans. Destinations include most major cities, especially those with Chinatowns, as well as casinos popular with Asian Americans. Despite increased regulation and crackdowns in the early 2010s, they have been credited for pioneering the curbside carrier model of intercity bus operation, as well as having been touted as "an authentic urban experience" for travellers.

=== Other ===
Many Fuzhounese people also work in the Chinatown garment industry. With time, however, the Fuzhounese population has become upwardly mobile in socioeconomic status. Second-generation Fuzhounese have high rates of educational attainment and often work in professional occupations like tech and finance.

== Locations ==
Hokchiu people in the U.S. are almost singularly concentrated in the New York metropolitan area, unlike other Chinese Americans and East Asian American groups. The number of Fuzhounese in New York City and nationwide is notably difficult to enumerate precisely, since as many as 50% of Fuzhounese immigrants are undocumented and may be reluctant to respond to census-takers. One estimate put the number of Fuzhou people in New York City at over 70,000; however, Einhorn in 1994 estimated that as many as 100,000 Fujianese were living in New York at the time, and that an additional 10,000 were arriving each year. Data from the 2005–2009 American Community Survey suggests there are around 1,450 Fuzhou speakers in the United States, although the number is likely to be far greater as most respondents simply wrote "Chinese".

=== New York City ===
==== Manhattan's Chinatown and Lower East Side ====
During the 1980s, growing numbers of Fuzhou immigrants started arriving into Manhattan's Chinatown. Because Manhattan's Chinatown was mostly Cantonese-speaking, many could not integrate well there. Instead, they began to settle on East Broadway and east of The Bowery, which was not fully developed as part of Chinatown but an overlapping enclave of Chinese, Latinos and Jewish populations. Many of the earlier Fuzhou immigrants learned to speak Cantonese to find work and to interact with most of Chinatown's residents. Many of the earlier Fuzhou immigrants to New York lived in Hong Kong for some time, adapting to the Hong Kong culture and learning to speak Cantonese. The Little Fuzhou enclave slowly emerged on the eastern borderline of Chinatown, which was still overlapped with some Latino and Jewish populations. It eventually became fully Chinese-populated and fully part of Manhattan's Chinatown. However, Chinatown became subdivided into the older established Cantonese Chinatown, in the western portion, and the newer Fuzhou Chinatown in the eastern portion. Some longtime Cantonese residents (many of them older generations) and businesses remain in Fuzhou Chinatown.

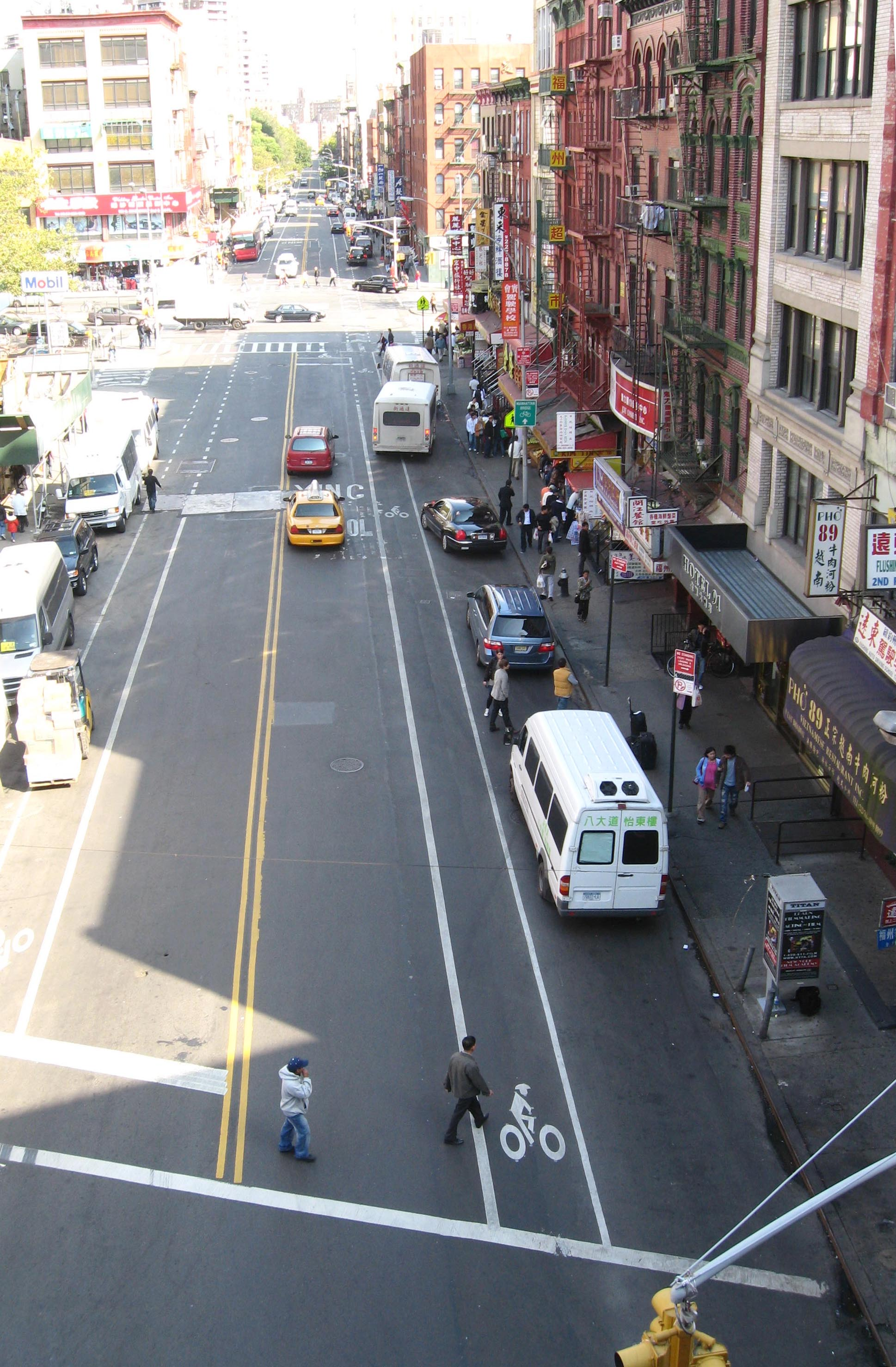
Little Fuzhou (on East Broadway) as seen from the Manhattan Bridge.

Hokchiu people have founded business organizations such as the Fuzhou-American Chamber of Commerce and Industry. In 1998, businesspeople from Changle founded the Changle American Association, which has become one of the most influential community organizations.

===== Shift to Brooklyn, Queens, and Nassau County =====
However, due to the gentrification situation of Manhattan's Chinatown since the 2000s, the Chinese population and businesses are declining and moving from the original Chinatown to newer Chinatowns in New York, and the Fuzhou immigrants are also part of this decline as well. Many of the Chinese in Manhattan's Chinatown are relocating to the newer Chinese enclaves in Brooklyn, Queens, and Nassau County. However, the Fuzhous that are moving out are mostly relocating to Sunset Park, which now has the largest Fuzhou community in all of New York City, while the Cantonese are moving to Bensonhurst, Brooklyn's newer and growing Chinese enclaves, which are primarily Cantonese populated.

==== Brooklyn's Sunset Park Chinatown ====
Like Manhattan's Chinatown in the past, Brooklyn's Sunset Park Chinatown was primarily Cantonese, but was much smaller and less developed, unlike Manhattan's Chinatown, which already had been very large and developed. With the gentrification and lack of available apartment units in Manhattan's Chinatown that came in the 2000s, the growing Fuzhou population shifted to Brooklyn's Sunset Park Chinatown to seek affordable housing and jobs. The shift of the Fuzhou immigration to Brooklyn's Sunset Park Chinatown dramatically expanded the Chinese enclave so prominently that it is now overwhelmingly Fuzhou populated and has far surpassed the size of the Fuzhou enclave in Manhattan's Chinatown. In addition, the Brooklyn Sunset Park Chinatown has overall surpassed the size of Manhattan's Chinatown. Unlike in Brooklyn's Sunset Park Chinatown, where the Fuzhou population has managed to dominate the whole enclave and is still growing quickly, the Fuzhou enclave in Manhattan's Chinatown only managed to occupy the eastern portion while the western portion of Manhattan's Chinatown still remains primarily Cantonese.

== Demographics ==
=== Political views ===
Compared to previous Chinese immigrants, Fuzhounese Americans tend to have a more favorable view of the People's Republic of China.

While the majority of the Fuzhou population in the US came directly from Fuzhou, some Fuzhounese Americans have also descended from Matsu, Fukien Province, R.O.C. and the Hokchiu (Foochowese) diaspora in Southeast Asia, particularly Malaysia and Singapore.

=== "Satellite Babies" ===
Some Fuzhounese people give birth to children in the US, then send their young children back to their hometowns because they are unable to raise them and work at the same time. Because of jus soli laws these children automatically gain American citizenship. These children are called "left-behind Americans" and are usually cared for by grandparents. They are reunited with their parents in the US once they have reached the age to attend grade school.

== Notable people ==
- Jeffrey Yi-Lin Forrest (1959–), professor of mathematics, systems science, economics, and finance at Pennsylvania State System of Higher Education (Slippery Rock campus)
- Lin Chen, founder of Summit Import Corporation, one of the largest importers of East Asian food on the East Coast
- Tung-Yen Lin (林同棪 1912–2003), structural engineer who pioneered the use of prestressed concrete
- Lin Yaohua (1910–2000), leading Chinese sociologist and anthropologist
- Maya Lin (October 5, 1959–), designer and artist known for her work in sculpture and land art; designer of the Vietnam Veterans Memorial
- Wang Shizhen (王世真; 1916–2016), Chinese nuclear medicine physician and academician of the Chinese Academy of Sciences (CAS), known as the "father of Chinese nuclear medicine"
- Victims of the Chen family homicides
- Wang Wen-hsing (王文興 1939–2023), Taiwanese writer
- Hsien Wu (吳憲 1893–1959), Chinese protein scientist
- Zhang Yuzhe (1902–1986), astronomer widely regarded as the "father of modern Chinese astronomy"

== See also ==
- Little Fuzhou (小福州)
- Fuzhou Town (福州埠), Brooklyn (布鲁克林)
- Chinese emigration
- Golden Venture, ship that smuggled 286 undocumented immigrants from China (mostly Fuzhou people from Fujian province) that ran aground on the beach at Fort Tilden in Rockaway Beach in Queens in 1993
- Asian Americans in New York City
- Bangladeshis in New York City
- Chinese people in New York City
- Demographics of New York City
- Filipinos in the New York metropolitan area
- Indians in the New York City metropolitan region
- Japanese in New York City
- Koreans in New York City
- Russians in New York City
- Taiwanese people in New York City
- The Leavers, novel by Lisa Ko about undocumented immigrants from Fuzhou
