= Eighth Avenue (Brooklyn) =

Avenue in Brooklyn, New York

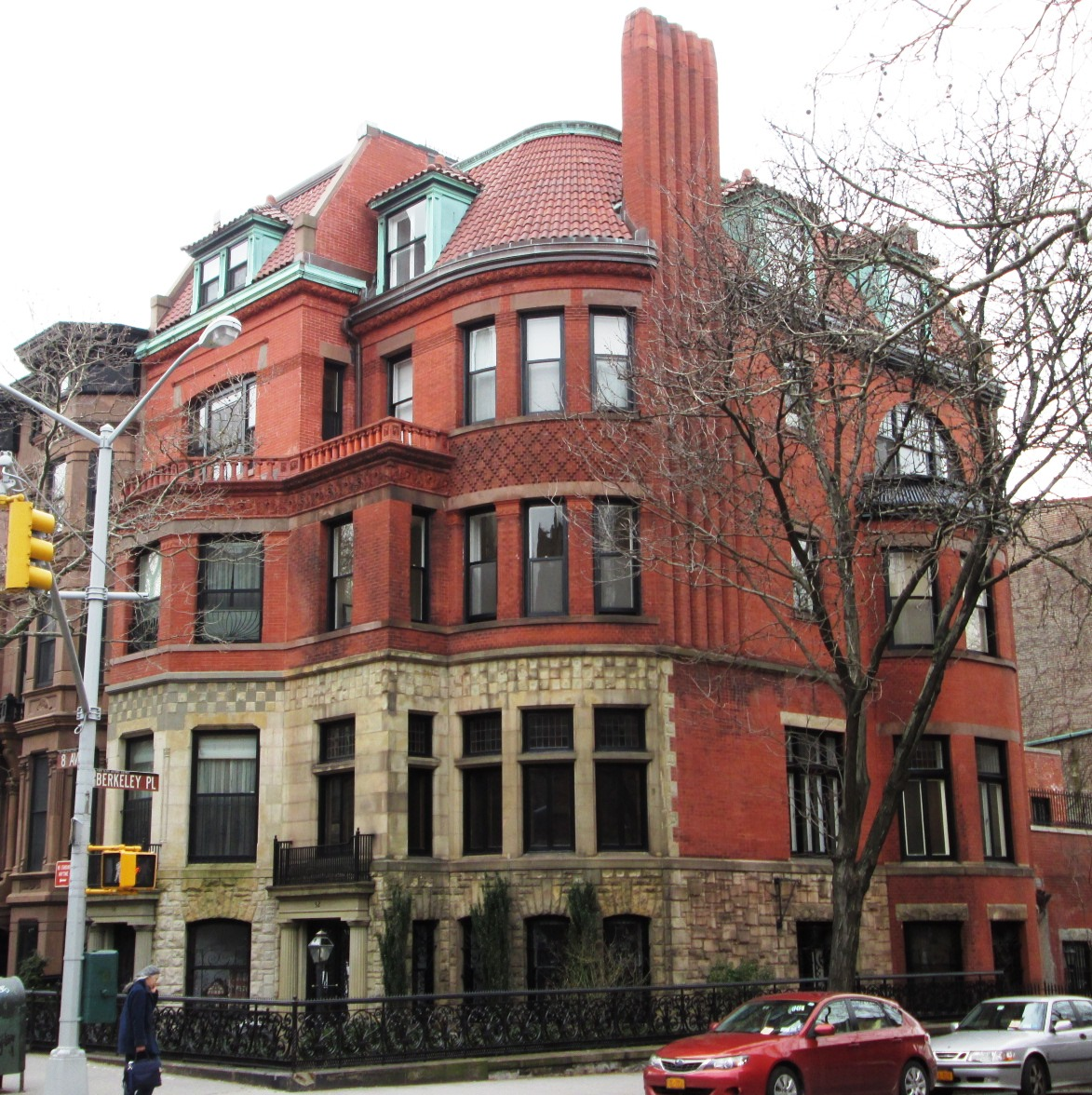
- 52–54 Eighth Avenue in Park Slope
- Interactive map of Eighth Avenue
- Owner: City of New York
- Maintained by: NYCDOT
- Length: 3.1 mi (5.0 km)
- Location: Brooklyn, New York City
- Coordinates: 40.637°N 74.008°W
- South end: 7th Avenue / 73rd Street in Dyker Heights
- Major junctions: NY 27 in South Slope
- North end: Flatbush Avenue in Park Slope
- East: Ninth Avenue
- West: Seventh Avenue

Eighth Avenue is a major street in Brooklyn, New York City. It is an ethnic enclave for Norwegians and Norwegian-Americans, who are one of the predominant ethnicities in the area among the current residents, which include new immigrant colonies, among them Chinese and Arabic-speaking peoples. Parts of it have been colloquially re-christened Little Hong Kong in recognition of these newer communities.

The avenue starts at its north at Grand Army Plaza, going through Park Slope for 1 mile (1.6 km). It is interrupted by the Green-Wood Cemetery between 20th and 39th Streets, and after traveling nearly 2 miles (3.2 km) further south through Sunset Park, finally ends at 73rd Street in Bay Ridge.

== Lapskaus Boulevard ==
External videos
- Norwegian documentary about Lobscouse Boulevard
- 3. På vandring

Lapskaus Boulevard (Bokmål: Lapskaus Boulevard, Nynorsk: Lapskaus Boulevard, lit. 'Lobscouse Boulevard') is the nickname of part of Eighth Avenue, in a Norwegian middle-class section of bordering Bay Ridge, and Sunset Park. This part of Eighth Avenue in Sunset Park is primarily home to Norwegian immigrants, and it is known as "Little Norway", or Lapskaus Boulevard as the Norwegians termed it.

The name lapskaus was derived from a Northern European stew that was a staple food of lower to middle income families. In Norway, lapskaus most often refers to a variation of beef stew. This dish may be called brun lapskaus (stew made with gravy), lys lapskaus stew made with vegetables and pork meat or suppelapskaus, where the gravy has been substituted by a light beef stock. While the New York City metropolitan area had a Norwegian presence for more than 300 years, immigration to Bay Ridge began to seriously take shape in the 1920s.

Nordic heritage is still apparent in some sections of the neighborhood. There is an annual Syttende Mai Parade, celebrated in honor of Norwegian Constitution Day. The parade features hundreds of people in folk dress (bunad) who march along Fifth Avenue. The parade ends with the crowning of Miss Norway near the statue of Leif Ericson. The monument was donated in 1939 by Crown Prince Olav, and features a replica of a Viking rune stone located in Tune, Norway. The stone stands on Leif Ericson Square just east of Fourth Avenue.

== Chinese community ==
In 1983, the first Chinese American grocery store in Brooklyn, called Choi Yung Grocery, was opened on 5517 Fort Hamilton Parkway. Selling both Asian and American products. In 1985, the first Cantonese style seafood restaurant opened on 8th avenue in between 55th and 56th street, called Canton house restaurant. In 1986, Winley Supermarket was opened on the corner of 8th Avenue. These unprecedented supermarkets and restaurants served the predominantly local residents of the area and attracted Chinese immigrants from all areas of Brooklyn. In 1988, the first Chinese Community nonprofit organization opened on Eighth Avenue to serving Sunset Park area Chinese immigrants, called the Brooklyn Chinese American Association (BCA).

Before 1984, there were only about thirty small shops on the entire Eighth Avenue and 90% of the original storefronts on Eighth Avenue in Sunset Park were abandoned. From 1982 to the present, Chinese immigrants began to move into Sunset Park for its affordable housing and easy access to Manhattan's Chinatown which revitalized the area and attracted more Chinese immigrants to move in. This also brought along ethnic businesses such as the Fung Wong Supermarket, opened in 1986, which helped develop the economy of Eighth Avenue between 39th and 65th streets.

== Transportation ==
The following subway stations are located at or near 8th Avenue:

- The Eighth Avenue subway station on the N train serves the avenue at 62nd Street.
- The Grand Army Plaza station of the 2 and 3 trains is at the eponymous plaza it serves, near the avenue’s northern end.

And these bus routes serve the corridor:

- The B70, serves the entire southern portion, with Dyker Heights service heading west on 70th Street.
- On the northern side, the B61 runs on two portions. Downtown Brooklyn service runs from 15th to 9th Streets, and Park Slope service runs from 20th to 19th Streets.

== See also ==
- Chinatowns in Brooklyn
- Chinatowns in New York City
