= Chen family killings =

2014 homicide near Albany, New York, US

- Undated photo of the Chen family
- Date: October 8, 2014
- Time: 3:30–6:30 a.m.
- Location: Guilderland, New York, U.S.; 42.6915°N 73.8711°W
- Type: Quadruple killings
- Cause: Beating and stabbing
- Deaths: 4
- Burial: All Faiths Cemetery, Middle Village, Queens, New York, U.S.

In the early afternoon of October 8, 2014, a coworker of Jin Chen, 39, of Guilderland, New York, United States, found the bodies of Chen, his wife and their two children in their home. Police were called to the scene and determined that the family had been killed sometime in the hours before dawn that day by either a knife or a hammer. No suspects have been identified and as of July 2026, the investigation is continuing.

It was the first quadruple homicide to occur in New York's Capital District, the region surrounding Albany, the state capital. A considerable amount of forensic evidence, including DNA, has been collected but has not generated any leads; cultural, legal, and linguistic barriers have also made progress difficult despite outreach to other law enforcement agencies in other large U.S. cities, Canada, and China. Investigators have considered links to Chinese American organized crime; there is evidence the Chens may have been involved in illegal gambling and/or the human trafficking of undocumented immigrants from China. They have also considered whether the killings are connected to an unsolved 2011 slaying of a Chinese immigrant family in Mississippi.

== Background ==
Chen Jinfeng (陈锦峰) and his similarly aged wife, Li Hai Yan (李海燕), natives of Houyu in the province of Fujian on the southeastern shore of mainland China, came to the U.S. in the early 2000s. They settled in the Albany suburb of Guilderland, near a take-out Chinese restaurant owned and operated by relatives, where Jin also worked. Two sons, Anthony and Eddy, were born in 2004 and 2007 respectively. They attended the local elementary school.

A neighbor told the Albany Times-Union later that the family lived what to him appeared to be a fairly normal life. He recalled the boys playing in the backyard while their mother gardened and kept watch. He recalled having brief conversations with Jin, whose English was adequate enough.

== Killings ==
Around midday on October 8, 2014, a coworker of Chen's at the King's Wok restaurant where he worked became concerned when he had not reported for work or called to say he would be absent or late. He went to the Chens' house a half-mile (1 km) away, on Western Avenue (U.S. Route 20), a busy four-lane highway, and found the bodies. Since his English was extremely limited, he had to ask another coworker, a relative of the Chens, to call 9-1-1 for him.

The Guilderland police responded, and soon began sealing off the crime scene, later assisted by the New York State Police, whose detectives were seen the following morning combing through the area behind and near the house. The scene soon attracted a considerable media presence, due to it being the first quadruple homicide to occur in the Capital District, (Note: At the end of 2017 another family of four was found slain in their house in Troy's Lansingburgh neighborhood, inviting comparisons to the Chen case, most of which were dismissed as coincidental.) as the metropolitan area around Albany, Schenectady and Troy is known. American Chinese-language media, such as the newspapers World Journal and Sing Tao, widely read among recent immigrants, also sent reporters to cover the case.

Police were slow to release information, and much of what was reported in the early days of the case came from relatives of the Chens who talked to the Chinese media at a news conference in New York City's Chinatown. Chen's brother told reporters there that his brother's body had been found on the first floor of the small bungalow, while the other members of the family were found upstairs, covered by a blanket. He denied an early report that they had been shot, and later details emerged that the victims had been beaten with a hammer; later accounts said they were stabbed as well.

The crime stunned Guilderland, normally a quiet suburb. "I've never seen anything like it", said Carol Lawlor, the town's police chief. She had grown up not only in the town but in the neighborhood where the Chens lived, which made it affect her even more. Impromptu memorials of flowers, candles and other mementoes were set up not only at the house, but also at the boys' elementary school.

Funeral services were held in Chinatown a month after the killings, to allow relatives from China to obtain visas and flights in order to attend. The family was laid to rest at All Faiths Cemetery in Middle Village, in the New York City borough of Queens.

== Investigation ==
Local law enforcement officials said later that the investigation progressed very slowly during its first 48 hours, a crucial period. "There were so many cultural impediments, language barriers (Note: Those barriers are additionally complicated by many of the potential witnesses not only speaking primarily Chinese but, as immigrants from Fujian, speaking the Min dialect of that language, and only speaking the official Mandarin dialect, with which Min is minimally intelligible, as a second language, making it difficult to find interpreters. Min is also itself dialectically diverse enough for many of its own dialects to be unintelligble even to other Min speakers.) and an overwhelming sense of fear", among the members of the local Chinese immigrant community detectives attempted to talk to, Albany County district attorney David Soares recalled later. The family offered a $5,000 reward, and Soares promised that, to the extent he could, his office would not initiate any actions that would result in deportation against anyone who had information to share, but neither offer induced much cooperation with the police.

Technological factors also made collecting evidence difficult. No homes or businesses in the immediate vicinity of the Chens had security cameras that might have provided footage to review. Police were also frustrated when Apple refused their initial requests to release the Chens' iPhone records. The company eventually complied, but Soares said their dealings with it "set us back considerably".

Forensic evidence yielded some information, but nothing that resulted in significant leads. The autopsies were able to put the victims' time of death at between 3:30 and 6:30 a.m. that day. Investigators were able to collect DNA samples that might belong to a suspect, but had not been able to determine who might have left it.

=== Alleged criminal connections ===
From the beginning there were allegations that the Chens had been involved in illegal business activities in addition to, or even instead of, the restaurant, such as human trafficking, money laundering, or illegal gambling. At the family's Chinatown news conference after the killings, Chen's brother denied an early report in Sing Tao that the family was murdered by someone who had returned after a late gambling party at the house to steal their considerable take from the event. He did, however, concede that Chen had indeed often had his friends over for low-stakes card games. A World Journal reporter in attendance later told the Albany Times-Union that she and her colleagues believed the family knew more about what might have led to the killings than they were ready to say publicly.

Newsday reported a month after the crime that state police had been putting up bilingual fliers seeking information and tips in restaurants and stores along East Broadway, in the section of Chinatown that, due to its high concentration of Fujianese immigrants in recent years, has increasingly come to be known as Little Fuzhou. It also said that an unnamed source had told the paper that Chen had shut down his restaurant two years earlier and his wife was in the U.S. illegally. Since he continued to live comfortably without any obvious income, it was widely believed in Chinatown that he was making his money in some illegal way, the source said. Chief Lawlor said, nonetheless, that there had been no evidence her department knew of that anything illegal was going on at the Chens' house or another one next door that had also been occupied by Chinese immigrants.

A week after the killings, the Times-Union reported that there was some evidence to support those claims as the New York City Police Department (NYPD) began assisting by investigating possible leads in its jurisdiction. Chen, the newspaper said, had allegedly been involved in large transfers of unrecorded cash used to pay undocumented Chinese workers at restaurants in the New York City area, the Capital District and beyond, transporting them from Chinatown to their jobs and back and providing accommodation in cities too far away for day bus trips. The week of the killing, a lengthy article in The New Yorker had documented this network, predominantly composed of Fujianese, for whom even the low pay and long hours at restaurants in the U.S. are preferable to the paucity of economic opportunities at home; the author's primary source mentioned having taken a day bus from Chinatown to Albany to work at a restaurant there at one point. Later it was reported that police had found 18 mattresses on the floor in the basement of the Chen house, further suggesting that the family had been involved in trafficking undocumented workers.

Investigators were also looking at possible connections with two other unsolved killings of Chinese immigrant families that had occurred elsewhere in the U.S. during the 2010s. In the first such incident, three members of the same family—a married couple and the wife's sister—were found stabbed in their D'Iberville, Mississippi, home in 2011. All were involved in running a family restaurant; investigators there believe the three were killed by professional assassins dispatched from New York City.

=== Later progress ===
A year after the killings, Scott Coburn, head of the state police's criminal investigations bureau, said that 600 leads had come in from various sources, which he considered to be unusually low for a crime this serious. In addition to the NYPD and the Federal Bureau of Investigation (FBI), both of which made interpreters available, investigators had reached out for help to police departments not only in other North American cities with large Asian populations, such as Chicago, Los Angeles, and Montreal, but to law enforcement in China, as well. Even so, Soares admitted at a news conference around the anniversary of the Chens' deaths that very little progress had been made.

In 2018, Robert Patnaude, commander of state police Troop G, which covers the Albany area, reiterated earlier pleas for help from the public, noting that sometimes even apparently trivial and innocuous information has solved cases. He could not say yet whether the killings were the work of organized crime, but allowed that "it's certainly a theory".

== See also ==
- Crime in New York (state)
- Deaths in October 2014
- List of unsolved deaths
