= Foochowese =

Foochowese can refer to:

- People or things of Fuzhou, Fujian Province, China
- Foochowese people, a people residing or originating in Fuzhou, China
- Foochowese (linguistics), the native language (used mainly by Western scholars) of Fuzhou and its surrounding counties
- Romanized Foochowese, a Latin alphabet for the Fuzhou dialect

== See also ==
- Hokchiu (disambiguation)
- Fuzhou (disambiguation)
