= Hokchiu =

Hokchiu may refer to:

- Fuzhou, the capital of Fujian province
- Foochow people
- Fuzhou dialect

== See also ==
- Foochowese (disambiguation)
- Fuzhou (disambiguation)
