= Fuzhou railway station (disambiguation) =

Fuzhou railway station may refer to:

- Fuzhou railway station (福州站), a railway station in Fuzhou, Fujian, China.
- Fuzhou railway station (Jiangxi) (抚州站), a railway station in Fuzhou, Jiangxi, China.
- Fuzhou railway station (New Taipei) (浮州站), a railway station in New Taipei, Taiwan.
