= Fuzhou railway station (Jiangxi) =

Railway station in Fuzhou, Jiangxi, China

Fuzhou 抚州
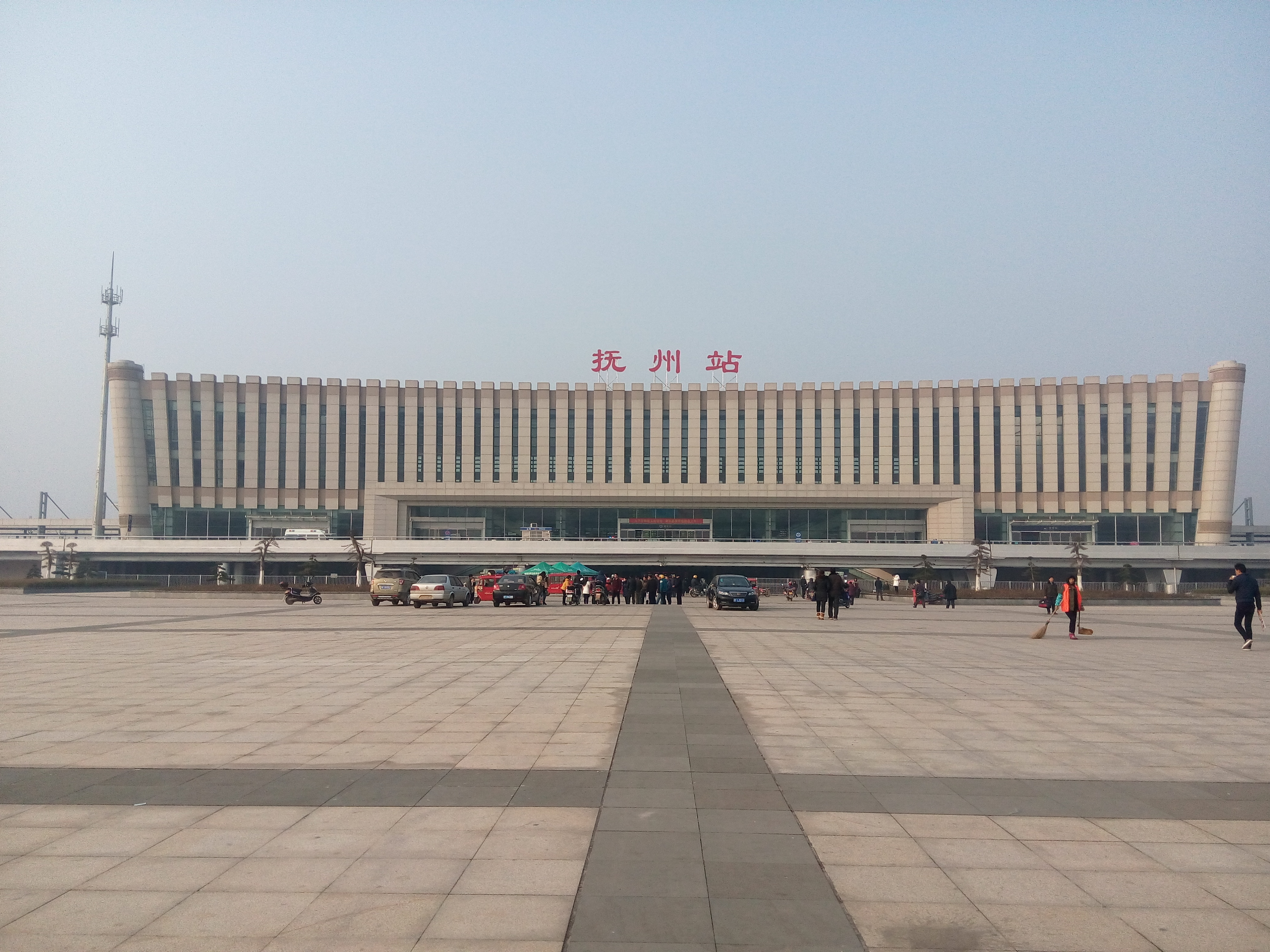

General information
- Location: Fuzhou, Linchuan District, Fuzhou, Jiangxi; China
- Coordinates: 27°55′18.46″N 116°20′54.73″E
- Operated by: China Railway
- Line: Xiangtang–Putian railway

History
- Opened: September 26, 2013
Location

Fuzhou railway station (simplified Chinese: 抚州站; traditional Chinese: 撫州站; pinyin: Fǔzhōu Zhàn) is a railway station on the Xiangtang–Putian railway located in Fuzhou, Jiangxi, People's Republic of China.
