= Chinatowns in Brooklyn =

Coordinates: 40.6355°N 74.0095°W

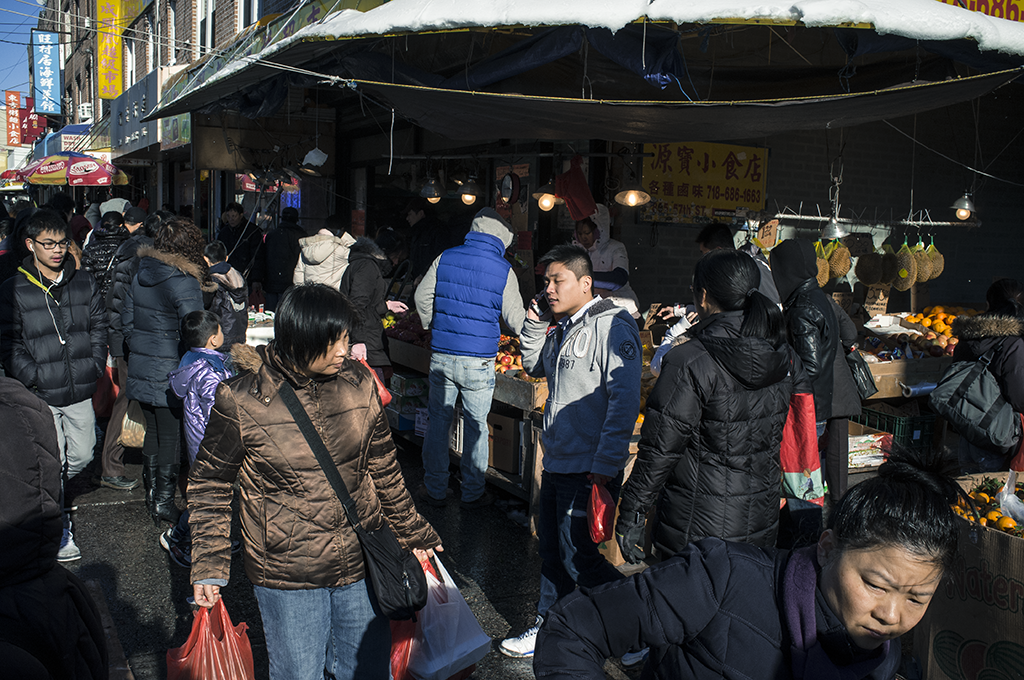
- 8th Avenue in Brooklyn Chinatown
- Traditional Chinese: 布魯克林華埠
- Simplified Chinese: 布鲁克林华埠
- Hanyu Pinyin: Bùlǔkèlín Huá Bù
- Jyutping: Bou3lou5haak1lam4 Waa4 Bou6
Transcriptions
Standard Mandarin
- Hanyu Pinyin: Bùlǔkèlín Huá Bù
- Gwoyeu Romatzyh: Buhluukelin Hwa Buh
- Wade–Giles: Pu^{4}lu^{3}k'e^{4}lin^{2} Hua^{2} Pu^{4}
- Tongyong Pinyin: Niǒuyue Húa Bú
- IPA: [pûlùkʰɤ̂lǐn xwǎ pʰû]
Hakka
- Romanization: Bu luˊ kiedˋ limˇ faˇ pu
Yue: Cantonese
- Jyutping: Bou3lou5haak1lam4 Waa4 Bou6
- IPA: [pο̄ulo̬uháːklȁːm wȁː pòu]

The first Brooklyn Chinatown was originally established in the Sunset Park area of the New York City borough of Brooklyn. It is one of the largest and fastest growing ethnic Chinese enclaves outside of Asia, as well as within New York City itself. Because this Chinatown is rapidly evolving into an enclave predominantly of Fuzhou immigrants from Fujian Province in China, it is now increasingly common to refer to it as the Little Fuzhou or Fuzhou Town of the Western Hemisphere; as well as the largest Fuzhou enclave of New York City.

Brooklyn's Chinese population has grown larger than the original Chinatown area, forming three larger Chinatowns between Sunset Park, Bensonhurst, and Avenue U in Sheepshead Bay. While the foreign-born Chinese population in New York City jumped 35 percent between 2000 and 2013, to 353,000 from about 262,000, the foreign-born Chinese population in Brooklyn increased from 86,000 to 128,000. The newer Brooklyn Chinatowns that evolved are mostly Cantonese speaking and therefore they are sometimes regarded as a Little Hong Kong/Guangdong or Cantonese Town.

The 2020 census data from New York City Department of City Planning indicated that Bensonhurst had Brooklyn's largest number of Asian residents, with 46,000, with Central Sunset Park containing 31,400 Asian residents. The Asian population in southern Brooklyn is primarily Chinese-speaking.

== Context ==
The New York metropolitan area contains the largest ethnic Chinese population outside of Asia, comprising an estimated 893,697 uniracial individuals as of 2017, including at least 12 Chinatowns – six (or nine, including the emerging Chinatowns in Corona and Whitestone, Queens, and East Harlem, Manhattan) in New York City proper, and one each in Nassau County, Long Island; Cherry Hill, Edison, New Jersey; and Parsippany-Troy Hills, New Jersey, not to mention fledgling ethnic Chinese enclaves emerging throughout the New York City metropolitan area. Chinese Americans, as a whole, have had a (relatively) long tenure in New York City. The first Chinese immigrants came to Lower Manhattan around 1870, looking for the "golden" opportunities America had to offer. By 1880, the enclave around Five Points was estimated to have from 200 to as many as 1,100 members.

However, the Chinese Exclusion Act, which went into effect in 1882, caused an abrupt decline in the number of Chinese who immigrated to New York and the rest of the United States. Later, in 1943, the Chinese were given a small quota, and the community's population gradually increased until 1968, when the quota was lifted and the Chinese American population skyrocketed. In the past few years, Cantonese, which dominated the Chinatowns for decades, is being rapidly swept aside by Mandarin Chinese, the national language of China and the lingua franca of most of the latest Chinese immigrants.

=== Early history ===
In the earlier part of the 20th century, Eighth Avenue in Sunset Park was primarily home to Norwegian immigrants, and it was known as "Little Norway", or "Lapskaus Boulevard", as the Norwegians termed it. Later on, as Norwegians left, the neighborhood increasingly became abandoned by the 1950s.

In 1983, the first Chinese American grocery store in Brooklyn (Store name: Choi Yung Grocery) was opened on 5517 Fort Hamilton Parkway. Selling both Asian and American products and in 1985. The first Cantonese style seafood restaurant opened on 8th Avenue in between 55 and 56 Street (Store name: Canton House Restaurant). In 1986, Winley Supermarket was opened on the corner of 8th Avenue (5523 8th Avenue). Those unprecedented supermarkets and the first Chinese seafood restaurant served the predominantly local residents of the area and attracted Chinese immigrants from all areas of Brooklyn.

In 1988, the first Chinese Community nonprofit organization opened on Eighth Avenue to serving Sunset Park area Chinese immigrants, the organization's name calls Brooklyn Chinese American Association (BCA).

Before 1984, there were only about thirty small shops on the entire Eighth Avenue and 90% of the original storefronts on Eighth Avenue in Sunset Park were abandoned. From 1984 to the present, Eighth Avenue has developed from a declining commercial area to an unlimited economic development potential with a thousand small businesses hub.

By 1988, 90% of the original storefronts on Eighth Avenue in Sunset Park were abandoned, but Winley Supermarket prevailed and continued to draw in more Asian visitors. Chinese immigrants then moved into this area – not only new arrivals from China, but also residents escaping the higher rents of the Manhattan Chinatown, fleeing to the lower property costs and rents of Sunset Park and forming the Brooklyn Chinatown.

=== Emergence ===
The relatively new but rapidly growing Chinatown located in Sunset Park was originally settled by Cantonese immigrants as had been Manhattan's Chinatown. In the past, Sunset Park had the highest Cantonese population in Brooklyn and strongly resembled Mott Street in Manhattan's Chinatown, the heart of the entrenched Cantonese community that continues to thrive in the western portion of Manhattan's Chinatown.

Although large numbers of non-Cantonese Chinese immigrants, often speaking Mandarin arrived in New York City, they could not relate to the Cantonese populations, which largely do not speak Mandarin or use it only to communicate with other non-Cantonese Chinese people. As a result, the non-Cantonese Chinese populations created their own Mandarin-speaking Chinatowns in Queens, or "Mandarin Town" (國語埠) in Flushing, and a smaller one in Elmhurst as well. This allowed Manhattan's and Brooklyn's Chinatowns to continue retaining its almost exclusive Cantonese-speaking society and nearly were successful at keeping its Cantonese dominance.

In the 1980s and 1990s, an influx of Fuzhou immigrants, who largely speak Fuzhounese, a Chinese topolect not mutually intelligible with other Chinese immigrants, arrived and settled in Lower Manhattan, around East Broadway and Eldridge Street. However, in the 2000s, due to gentrification and housing shortages, the Fuzhou influx shifted to Brooklyn's Chinatown in much greater numbers, supplanting the Cantonese at a significantly higher rate than in Manhattan. Sunset Park's Chinatown, Brooklyn's largest, now mostly populated by Fuzhou immigrants has been far surpassing the eastern portion of Manhattan's Chinatown as NYC's primary Fuzhou cultural center. As a result, Brooklyn's Sunset Park Chinatown is now increasingly becoming the main attraction for newly arrived Fuzhou immigrants into New York City.

Hakka has also emerged as another rapidly emerging language in the neighborhood.

=== Citywide demographics ===
As the city proper with the largest ethnic Chinese population outside of Asia by a wide margin, estimated at 628,763 as of 2017, and as the primary destination for new Chinese immigrants, New York City is subdivided into official municipal boroughs, which themselves are home to significant Chinese populations, with Brooklyn and Queens, adjacently located on Long Island, leading the fastest growth. After the City of New York itself, the boroughs of Queens and Brooklyn encompass the largest Chinese populations, respectively, of all municipalities in the United States.

Chinese Americans in New York City
borough	Chinese Americans residents	
borough	percent	number
Queens	10.2	265,135
Brooklyn	7.9	222,059
Manhattan	6.6	119,208
Staten Island	2.9	27,707
The Bronx	0.5	7,859
New York City		573,388

In the 2020 census data by NYC Dept. Of City Planning, the Asian populations in these other southern Brooklyn neighborhoods all together have overwhelmingly outnumbered the Asian population in Sunset Park. Bensonhurst alone already surpassed Sunset Park as having the largest concentration of Asian residents of Brooklyn. Bensonhurst has 46,000 Asian residents along with the nearby neighborhoods of western Gravesend having 26,700 Asian Residents and Dyker Heights having between 20,000 and 29,999 Asian residents, meanwhile Sunset Park has 31,400 Asian Residents. The Asian Residents in southern Brooklyn neighborhoods are still overwhelmingly Chinese residents. The Brooklyn satellite Chinatowns also have small significant amounts of Vietnamese Chinese residents integrated into these communities with Sheepshead Bay having the largest concentrations.

== Fuzhou Town, Brooklyn ==
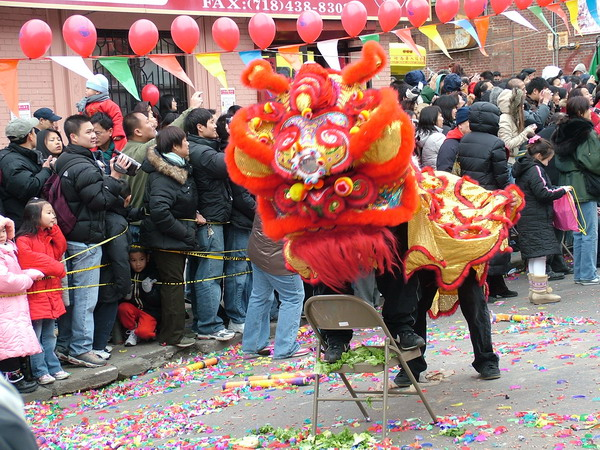
Celebrating Chinese New Year on 8th Avenue

During the 1980s and 1990s, the majority of newly arriving Fuzhou immigrants were settling within Manhattan's Chinatown, and the first Little Fuzhou community emerged in New York City within Manhattan's Chinatown; by the 2000s, however, the center of the massive Fuzhou influx had shifted to Brooklyn's Chinatown, which is now home to the fastest growing and largest Fuzhou population in New York City as well as causing the ethnic enclave to develop more fully and expand much further.

=== Shift of the Fuzhou influx ===
Since the 2000s, gentrification in Manhattan's Chinatown has pushed back the growth of Fuzhou immigrants and growth of Chinese immigrants in general, resulting in a growing Chinese population primarily centered in Queens and Brooklyn.

=== Fuzhou homeowners ===
With the rapidly growing influx of Fuzhou homeownership in Brooklyn's Chinatown and like many other Chinese immigrants and other ethnic immigrants in general who have become successful homeowners, the Fuzhou homeowners subdivide single-family houses into multiple apartments to rent to tenants. This has opened opportunities as well as led to the Brooklyn Chinatown becoming the new nexus for new arriving Fuzhou immigrants to New York City, to seek landlords of Fuzhou descent and to be able rent an apartment at a lower price in better conditions than in Manhattan's Chinatown with less housing discrimination and barriers imposed on them, in contrast to Cantonese landlords that are more likely to discriminate against Fuzhou immigrants and not wanting them to be tenants in their properties, however there are Fuzhou landlords that can sometimes still discriminate Fuzhou tenants by imposing high rent prices. Many Fuzhou immigrants in Brooklyn's Chinatown have also illegally subdivided apartments into small spaces to rent to other Fuzhou immigrants.

Unlike the Little Fuzhou within Manhattan's Chinatown, which further developed the newer portion of Manhattan's Chinatown rather than settling in the center of the Cantonese community of Manhattan's Chinatown and still remains surrounded by areas which continue to house significant populations of Cantonese, all of Brooklyn's Chinatown is swiftly consolidating into New York City's new Little Fuzhou and is beginning to resemble more and more of The New Chinatown of Manhattan, which is the newer portion of Manhattan's Chinatown established by the Fuzhou immigrants primarily concentrated on the East Broadway and Eldridge Street portion.

An influx of Fuzhou immigrants caused the price of real estate to increase. More recently, Wenzhounese immigrants from China's Zhejiang Province arrived in Brooklyn Chinatown. Also in contrast to Manhattan's Chinatown, which still successfully continues to carry a large Cantonese population and retain the large Cantonese community established decades ago in the western section of Manhattan's Chinatown, where Cantonese residents have a communal gathering venue to shop, work, and socialize, Brooklyn's Chinatown is now very quickly losing its Cantonese community identity. However with the revitalization of the economy in area, The Fuzhounese population in this area has now faced the challenge of dealing with gentrification. Being forced to move out of Sunset Park due to rent increase and competition from real estate developers. Neighborhoods like Bensonhurst and Gravesend offer quick and easy transportation for the Fuzhounese community to access the expansive employment network offered on East Broadway.

=== Connection to Manhattan's Chinatown ===
Since the 1980s, the neighborhood has attracted many Mainland Chinese immigrants, along Eighth Avenue Avenue from 42nd to 68th Street. Some claim the reason the Chinese settled on 8th Avenue is because in Chinese folklore, the number eight is lucky for financial matters, and "8th Avenue" can be loosely interpreted as "road to wealth". Another explanation is the direct subway ride to Manhattan's Chinatown on the BMT Fourth Avenue Line of the New York City Subway (D, N, R, and W services). In written Chinese translation, 8th Avenue is called 八大道. The Cantonese pronunciation for 8th Avenue is Baat Daaih Douh. 8th Avenue, which has a subway station, is lined with Chinese businesses, including grocery stores, restaurants, Buddhist temples, video stores, bakeries, and community organizations, and even a Hong Kong Supermarket. This Chinatown is considered to be an extension of the original Chinatown in Manhattan.

=== Ornamental "friendship arch" ===
In 2017, it was announced that Chaoyang District, Beijing, would sponsor a 40-foot-tall (12 m), 12-foot-wide (3.7 m) "friendship archway" to be erected on Eighth Avenue between 60th and 61st Streets. The arch, which was based on the design of Beijing's Temple of Heaven, was unanimously approved by Brooklyn Community Board 7 in 2015. One side of the arch would read "One Family over Four Seas" in Chinese and the other side would read "Brooklyn–Beijing Chaoyang" in English.

== Satellite Chinatowns ==
=== Brooklyn's Little Guangdong/Little Hong Kong ===
The emerging Brooklyn satellite Chinatowns are primarily dominated by Cantonese populations, but as of the 2010s these enclaves are more scattered and rather mixed in with other ethnic populations. They are extensions of Manhattan's Western Cantonese Chinatown or Little Hong Kong/Guangdong or Cantonese Town, but at the same time similarly resemble the 1970s–80s of Manhattan's Chinatown when it was still in expansion mode overlapping into other ethnic enclaves. However, the Cantonese population growth in these areas have surpassed Manhattan's Chinatown's Cantonese speaking population and with Bensonhurst carrying Brooklyn's largest Cantonese population with several of their enclaves on 18th Avenue, Bay Parkway and 86th Street, it is slowly taking over as NYC's largest primary Cantonese cultural center meanwhile Manhattan's Chinatown is undergoing gentrification. Therefore, Bensonhurst and Sheepshead Bay are now increasingly becoming New York City's main attractions for newly arriving Cantonese immigrants.

As the Cantonese dissipate from the main Brooklyn Chinatown in Sunset Park, the Avenue U Chinatown and the Bensonhurst Chinatown now carry the majority of the established Cantonese population and continuing to quickly grow in Brooklyn along with new and growing Chinese immigrant population.

The second Chinatown and the third Chinatown of Brooklyn, along with other emerging clusters of Chinese businesses and people in other parts of Bensonhurst particularly on 18th Avenue and Bay Parkway around the N and W services, could possibly in the future become the new gathering centers and central business districts for the Cantonese residents in Brooklyn, resembling the western portion of Manhattan's Chinatown in the same way that the main Brooklyn Chinatown in Sunset Park is quickly becoming a gathering center and central business district for the Fuzhou residents in Brooklyn, resembling East Broadway in Manhattan's Chinatown.

=== Chinatown, Avenue U ===
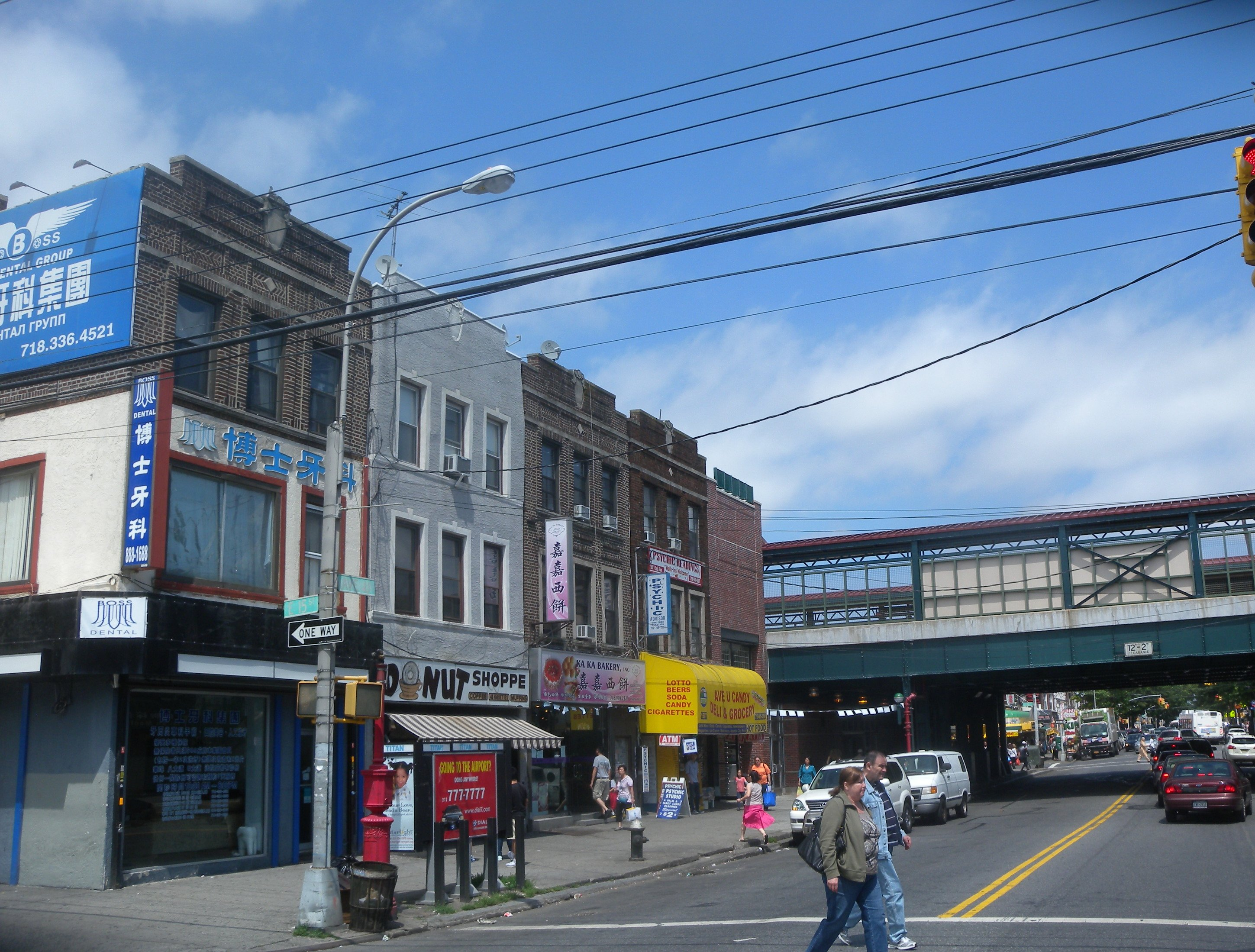
The developing Avenue U Chinatown

Avenue U in Homecrest now supports southern Brooklyn's second Chinatown, as evidenced by the rapidly growing number of Chinese food markets, bakeries, restaurants, beauty and nail salons, and computer and consumer electronics dealers between Coney Island Avenue and Ocean Avenue. Since 2004, the Q train on the BMT Brighton Line goes to Canal Street in the Manhattan Chinatown to Brooklyn's Avenue U Chinatown directly. The area was formerly served by M, and D trains, both of which went to Manhattan's Chinatown, at Canal Street and Grand Street stations, respectively.

This Chinatown is actually a second extension of Manhattan's Chinatown, after the original Brooklyn Chinatown which had developed in Sunset Park. Within a sixteen-year period, the Chinese population multiplied by an estimated fourteenfold in the Avenue U Chinatown, which is now in expansion mode. The increasing property values and congestion in Brooklyn's first established Chinatown on 8th Avenue in Sunset Park led to the still increasing Chinese population in Brooklyn pouring into the Sheepshead Bay and Homecrest sections, which in the late 1990s resulted in the establishment of a second Chinatown on Avenue U between the Homecrest and Sheepshead Bay sections.

=== Chinatown, Bensonhurst ===
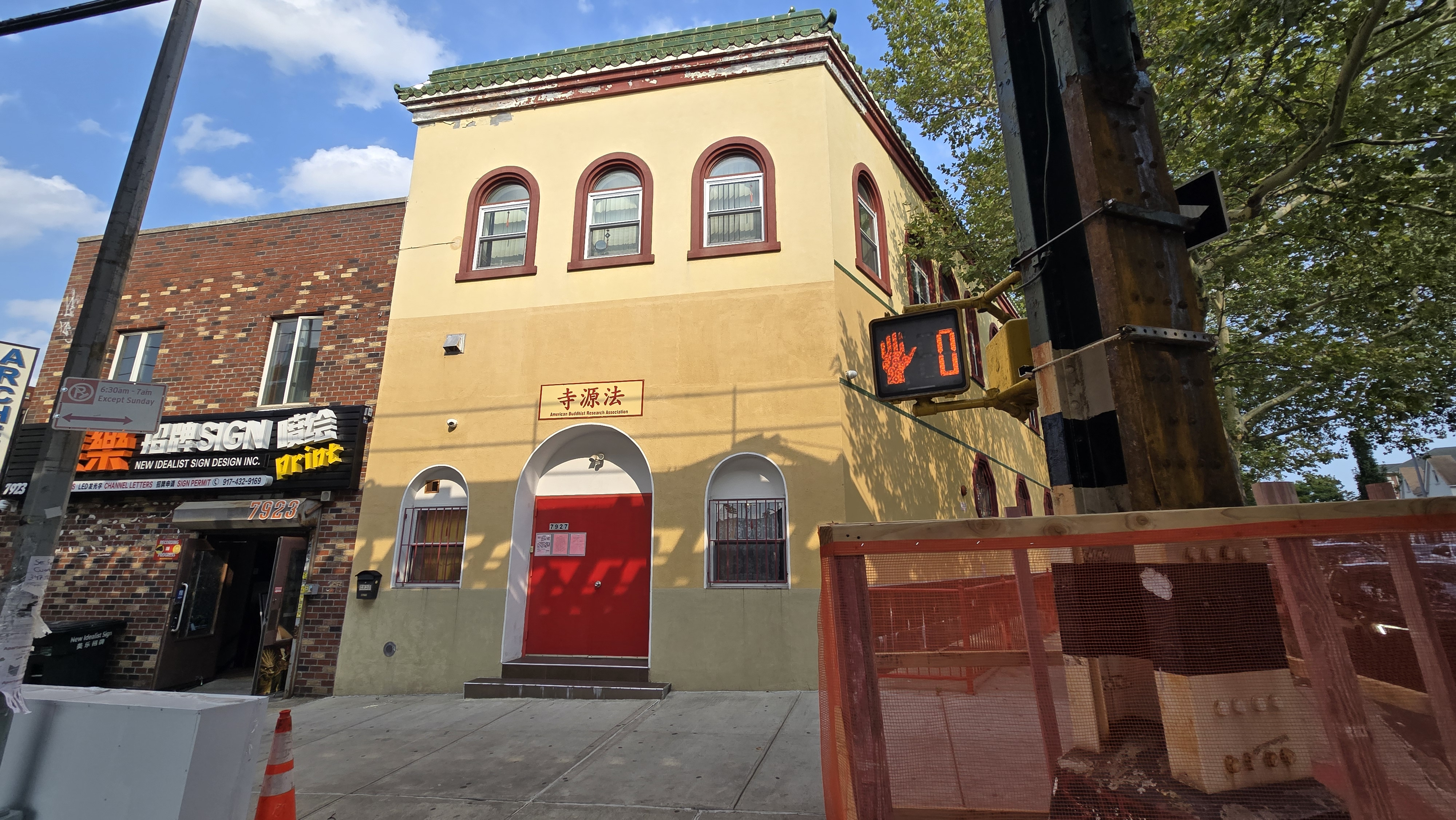
Buddhist temple in Bensonhurst, Brooklyn

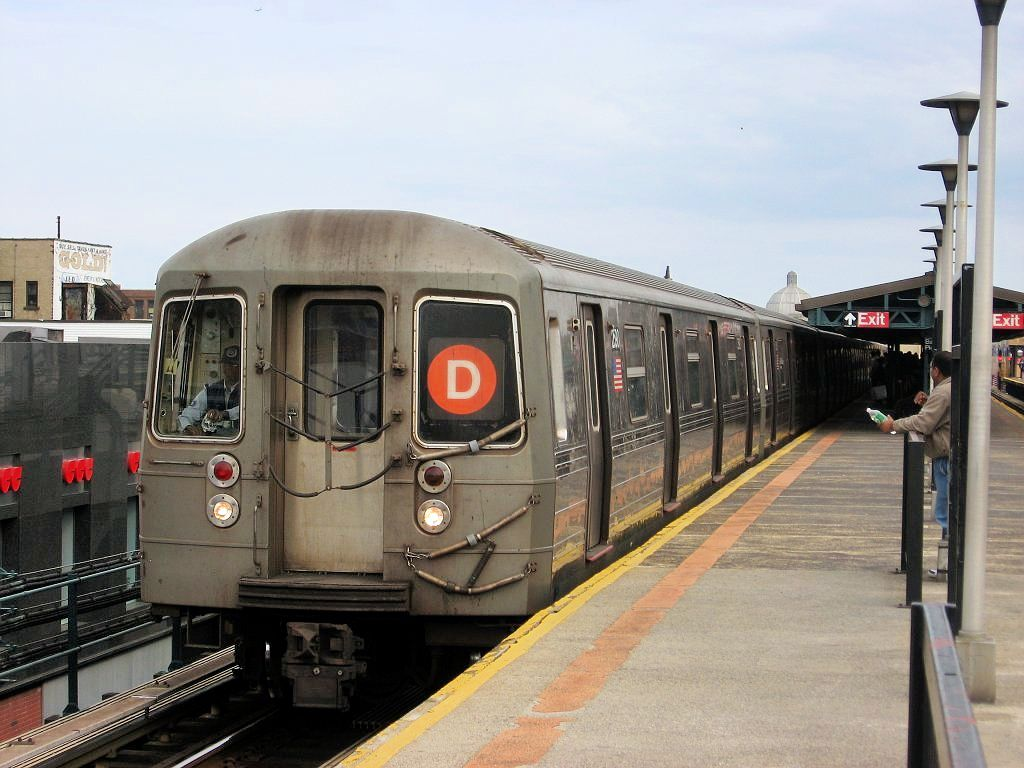
D train at the Bay Parkway station

Nearby in southern Brooklyn in Bensonhurst, several new Chinatowns have emerged on 18th Avenue near the 18th Avenue station between 60th to 78th Street to approximately the Bay Parkway station (both served by the N and W trains) and below the elevated D, R, and W services structure along on 86th Street between 18th Avenue and Stillwell Avenue. Within recent years, most new businesses opening within these portions of Bensonhurst have been Chinese. Since 2004, the D, R, and W trains has been directly connected 24/7 from the Grand Street station in Manhattan's Chinatown to the rapidly growing Chinese enclave between 18th Avenue and 25th Avenue, and Bensonhurst Chinatowns have become a third extension of Manhattan's Chinatown. (Previously, the B and later the W went to both Bensonhurst and Chinatown, but only during the daytime; this was changed to full-time D, R, and W services due to residents' demands.)

They are also in some way becoming a second extension of Brooklyn's 8th Avenue Chinatown, since transfers between D and N trains are easy. On 86th Street, it is home to growing Chinese restaurants including the 86 Wong Chinese Restaurant, which is one of the earliest Chinese restaurants and businesses to be established on this street. Chinese grocery stores, salons, bakeries, and other types of Chinese businesses are also expanding swiftly on this street.

Bensonhurst was once a predominantly Italian-American neighborhood. The new arrival of Chinese immigrants in the decades following the 1965 Immigration Act led to racial tensions materializing into Anti-Asian flyers distributed throughout the neighborhood along with racially motivated attacks against the Asian American community. This led to leaders from different ethnic backgrounds, such as the CAAAV (Coalition Against Anti Asian-American Violence) and Italian-American leaders from local churches and schools to join together to address these racially based tensions and violence, for the promotion of a harmonious community.There is still currently a mixture of different ethnic businesses and people, especially with many Italians and Russians still in the Bensonhurst neighborhood. However, with the highly rapid rate of growth of Chinese businesses and people in the area, the proportion of the Chinese population is increasing; and these several Chinatowns of Bensonhurst together has far surpassed the size of the Avenue U Chinatown. In addition, Bensonhurst has slowly been surpassing Manhattan's Chinatown as carrying the largest Cantonese cultural center of NYC.

According to the Daily News, Brooklyn's Asian population, mainly Chinese, has grown tremendously not only in the Sunset Park area, but also in Bensonhurst, Dyker Heights, and Borough Park. In Bensonhurst alone, from 2000 to 2010, the Asian population increased by 57%. The study also shows that Asians very often live in houses that are divided into studio apartments, which means there is a possibility that the increased Asian population could be more than what the census represents and causing stressors on the growing Asian population in Brooklyn.

According to the 2020 census data from NYC Dept. Of City Planning, Bensonhurst overtook Sunset Park as the Brooklyn neighborhood with the largest Asian population. The 2020 census data showed that Bensonhurst had 46,000 Asian residents meanwhile Sunset Park had 31,400 Asian residents.

==== New York City's largest Hong Kong community ====
The adjacent neighborhoods of Bensonhurst and Bath Beach collectively have the largest concentration of Hong Kong immigrants in New York City. The 2010 census information shows that Bensonhurst has 3,723 Hong Kong residents, while Bath Beach has 1,049 Hong Kong residents.

== Culture, Community, Economy and Businesses ==
=== Socio-economic context ===
Paul Mak, president of the Brooklyn Chinese American Association, estimates that of the Chinese residents of Sunset Park, close to 90% live under the poverty line. Moreover, the majority of students in Sunset Park schools are eligible for free lunches—between 80% and 90% of students, which the majority of which are Chinese. In 2002, 90% of workers employed in Sunset Park work 10 to 12 hours a day.

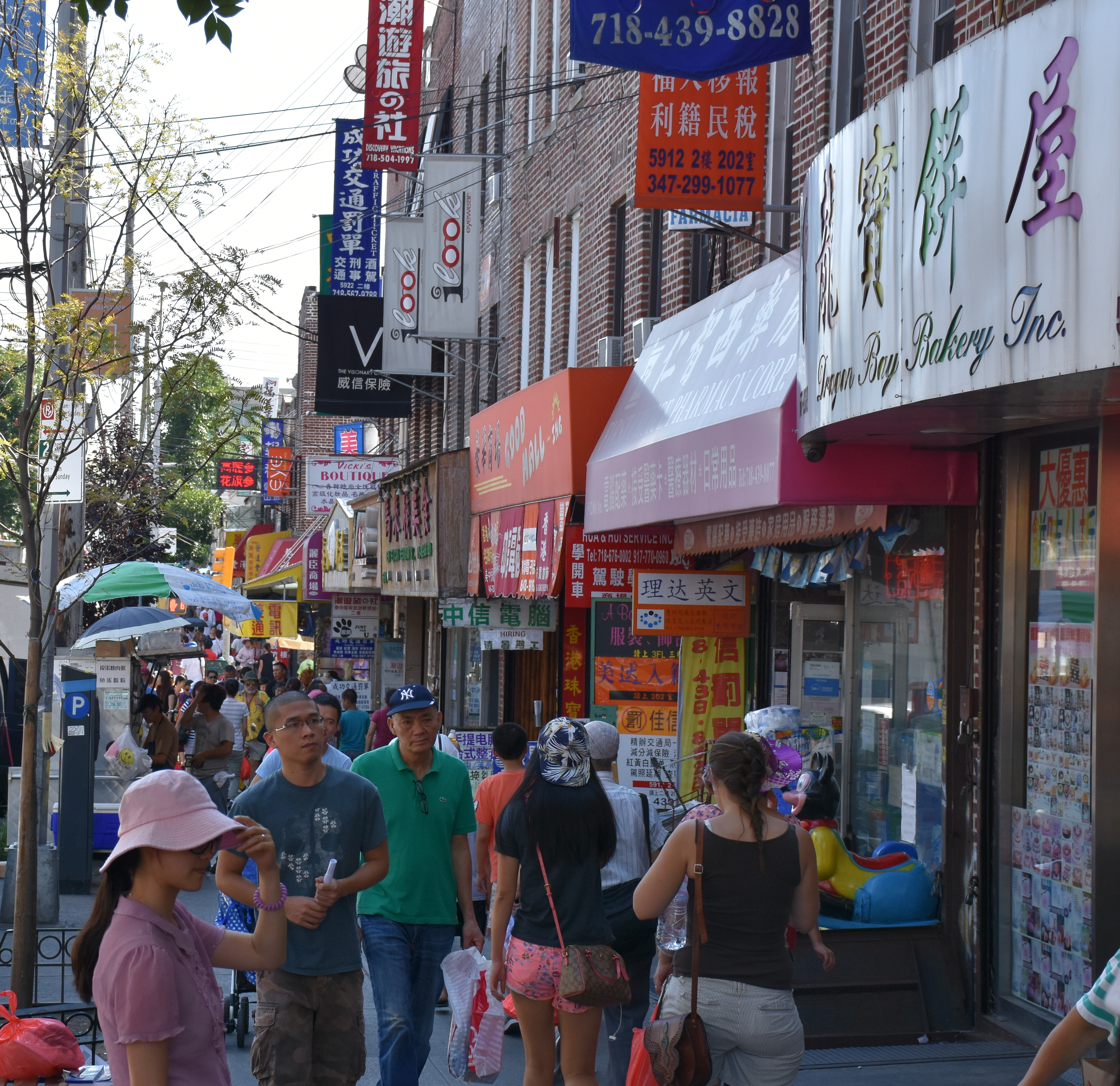
Eighth Avenue in Sunset Park, the hub of Brooklyn's largest Chinatown, seen in 2015

==== Cantonese population ====
Initially, this Chinatown was a small Cantonese enclave when it first emerged during the 1980s and 1990s, but in the 2000s, the Sunset Park Chinatown's demographics changed very quickly. A large Fuzhouese population moved in, and the Sunset Park's Chinatown started to resemble parts of Little Fuzhou in Manhattan—particularly East Broadway, the main gathering center for Fuzhou residents in Manhattan. The Fuzhou population has also spread into 7th and 9th Avenues and north onto 50th through 42nd Streets; this segment is also where many Fuzhou businesses are concentrated along 8th Avenue as well as on 7th Avenue, causing the overall Chinese community to expand even further, however in recent years a large growing influx of the Fuzhou businesses, including the Fuzhou residents also flooded in the segment of 50th to 65th Streets of 8th Avenue, which is the original core of the Brooklyn Chinatown. By 2009 many Mandarin-speaking people had moved to Sunset Park. By the late 1990s, the growing Cantonese population in Brooklyn had begun to dramatically shift into Bensonhurst and Sheepshead Bay instead of settling into Sunset Park including many of the Cantonese already living in Sunset Park also began migrating into Bensonhurst and Sheepshead Bay starting in the late 1990s and especially in the early 2000s and with the large influx of Fuzhou immigrants coming, only a handful of Cantonese residents still remain often longer time and older generation residents in the now heavily Fuzhou dominated Chinatown of Sunset Park.

=== Religion ===
In Sunset Park lies the largest Fuzhounese religious community, belonging to the Church of Grace to the Fujianese, where converts are baptized every year and Sunday service is held weekly.

=== Garment industry ===
Throughout the 1980s and 1990s, massive influxes of Chinese people immigrated to look for work. Many of these immigrants would be hired by garment stores, which were also owned by Chinese families. These new hires would often work long hours for wages that were below the minimum wage at the time. These shops first started their activities in Manhattan, then moved to Brooklyn due to the cheaper cost per square feet. During the 1980s and 1990s, there were many Chinese immigrants from different regions. The garment stores were able to work the Fujian immigrants longer and pay them less, causing tension between the already established Cantonese population and the incoming Fujianese population.

Often these workshops lacked found to have violated labor law. Some of these violations include but not limited to children employment and fire hazards. The Apparel Industry Task Force was created to find and enforce labor laws.

== Expansion of satellite Chinatowns ==
Since Brooklyn's Chinatown emergence on 8th Avenue in Sunset Park, the Chinese population has over the years expanded further into Brooklyn's Sheepshead Bay, Homecrest, Bensonhurst, Dyker Heights, Bath Beach, and Gravesend neighborhoods. Homecrest Community Services, which serves Brooklyn's Chinese population, opened in Sheepshead Bay in the area of Brooklyn's second Chinatown in Homecrest and opened a smaller office in Brooklyn's third Chinatown in Bensonhurst. This emerging massive Chinese presence in Brooklyn has poured especially into Sheepshead Bay, Homecrest, and Bensonhurst, due to the overcrowding and rising property values in the original Brooklyn Chinatown in Sunset Park.

== See also ==
- Chinese Americans in New York City
- Fuzhounese Americans
- Other Chinatowns in NYC:
  - Chinatown, Manhattan
  - Little Hong Kong/Guangdong
  - Chinatowns in Queens
  - Little Fuzhou
  - Chinatown, Flushing
  - Chinatown, Elmhurst and Corona, Queens
- Chinatown bus lines
- Chinatowns in the United States
- List of Chinatowns in the United States
- Koreatowns in the NYC area:
  - Koreatown, Manhattan
  - Koreatown, Long Island
  - Koreatown, Fort Lee
  - Koreatown, Palisades Park
