= Little Fuzhou =

Neighborhood in Manhattan, New York City

Coordinates: 40°42′52″N 73°59′16″W

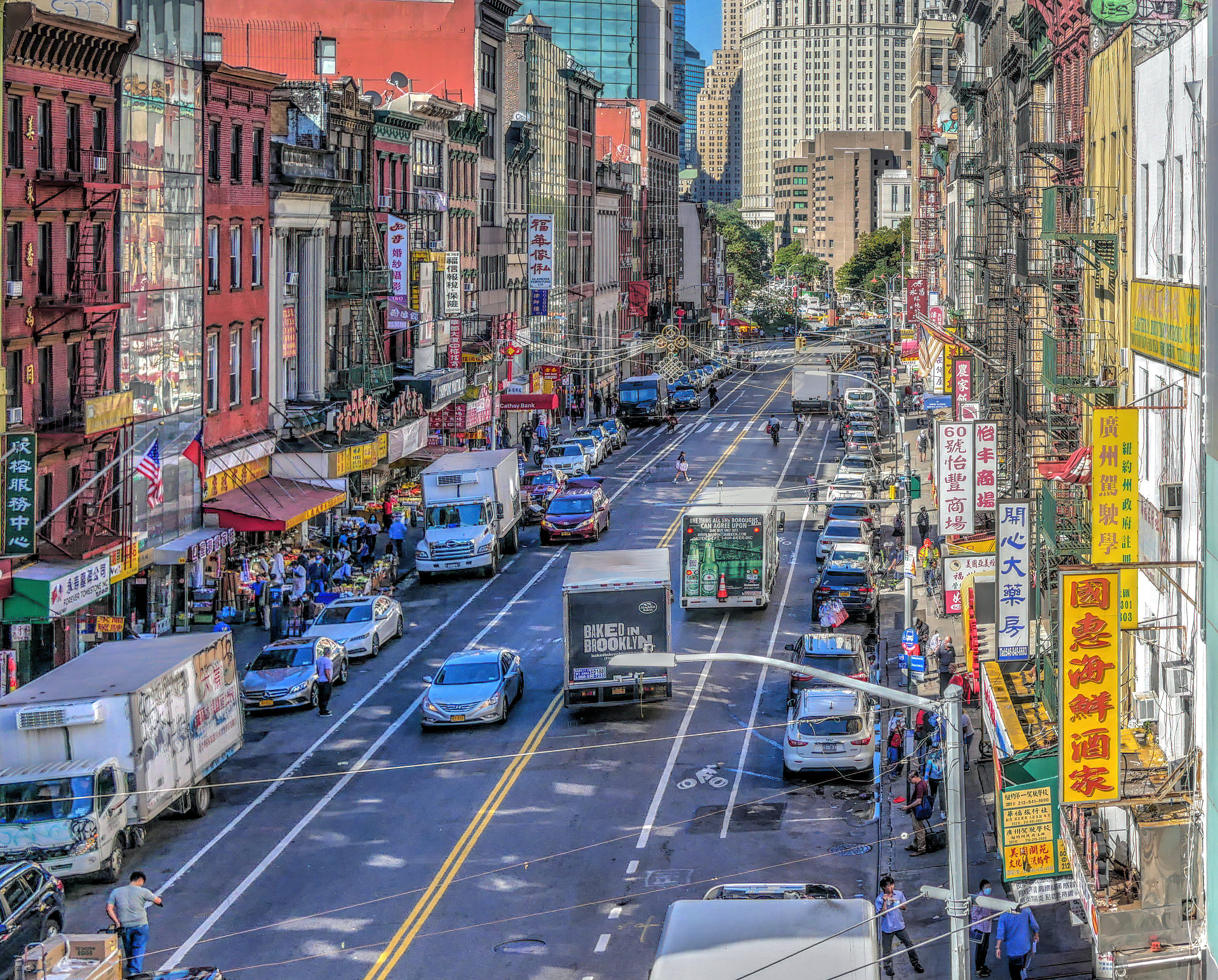
- Little Fuzhou on East Broadway as seen from Manhattan Bridge
- Traditional Chinese: 小福州
- Simplified Chinese: 小福州
Transcriptions
Standard Mandarin
- Hanyu Pinyin: Xiǎo Fúzhōu
- Gwoyeu Romatzyh: Sheau Fwujou
- Wade–Giles: Hsiao^{3} Fu^{2}chou^{1}
- Tongyong Pinyin: Siǎo Fújhōu
- IPA: [ɕjàʊ fǔʈʂóʊ]
Yue: Cantonese
- Jyutping: Siu2 Fuk1zau1
- IPA: [sǐːu fʊ̂ktsɐ̂u]
Southern Min
- Hokkien POJ: Siáu-hok-chiu
Eastern Min
- Fuzhou BUC: Siēu-hók-ciŭ

Alternative Chinese name
- Traditional Chinese: 東百老匯區
- Simplified Chinese: 东百老汇区
- Literal meaning: East Broadway Quarter
Transcriptions
Standard Mandarin
- Hanyu Pinyin: Dōng Bǎilǎohuì Qū
- Gwoyeu Romatzyh: Dong Baelaohuey Chiu
- Wade–Giles: Tung^{1} Paai^{3} Ch'ü^{1}
- Tongyong Pinyin: Dong Bǎilǎohuèi Cyu
- IPA: [tʊ́ŋ pàɪlàʊxwêɪ tɕʰý]
Yue: Cantonese
- Yale Romanization: Dung Bailauhwei Chyu
- Jyutping: Dung1 Baak3lou5wui6 Keoi1
- IPA: [tɔ̂ːŋ.pāːklo̬wu̬ːi.kêy]
Southern Min
- Hokkien POJ: Tang-pah-lāu-hōe Khu
Eastern Min
- Fuzhou BUC: Dĕng-peh-lō-hóe Ku

Little Fuzhou is a neighborhood in the Two Bridges and Lower East Side areas of the borough of Manhattan in New York City, United States. Little Fuzhou constitutes a portion of the greater Manhattan Chinatown, home to the highest concentration of Chinese people in the Western Hemisphere. Manhattan's Chinatown is also one of the oldest Chinese ethnic enclaves.

Manhattan Chinatown is one of nine Chinatown neighborhoods in New York City, as well as one of twelve in the New York metropolitan area, which contains the largest ethnic Chinese population outside of Asia, comprising an estimated 893,697 uniracial individuals as of 2017. Starting in the 1980s and especially in the 1990s, the neighborhood became a prime destination for immigrants from Fuzhou, the capital of Fujian province in southeastern China.

Manhattan's Little Fuzhou is centered on East Broadway. However, since the 2000s, Brooklyn Chinatown in the neighborhood of Sunset Park became New York City's new primary destination for Fuzhou immigrants, surpassing the original enclave in Manhattan.

== History ==
=== Early history ===
East Broadway was once a main street of a large Jewish community on the Lower East Side. Over the years, Puerto Ricans and African-Americans settled on the street. During the 1960s, an influx of immigrants from Hong Kong and Vietnam found homes on East Broadway and the areas surrounding it. Slowly, the Puerto Ricans, Jews, and African-Americans moved from the area.

=== Manhattan enclave ===
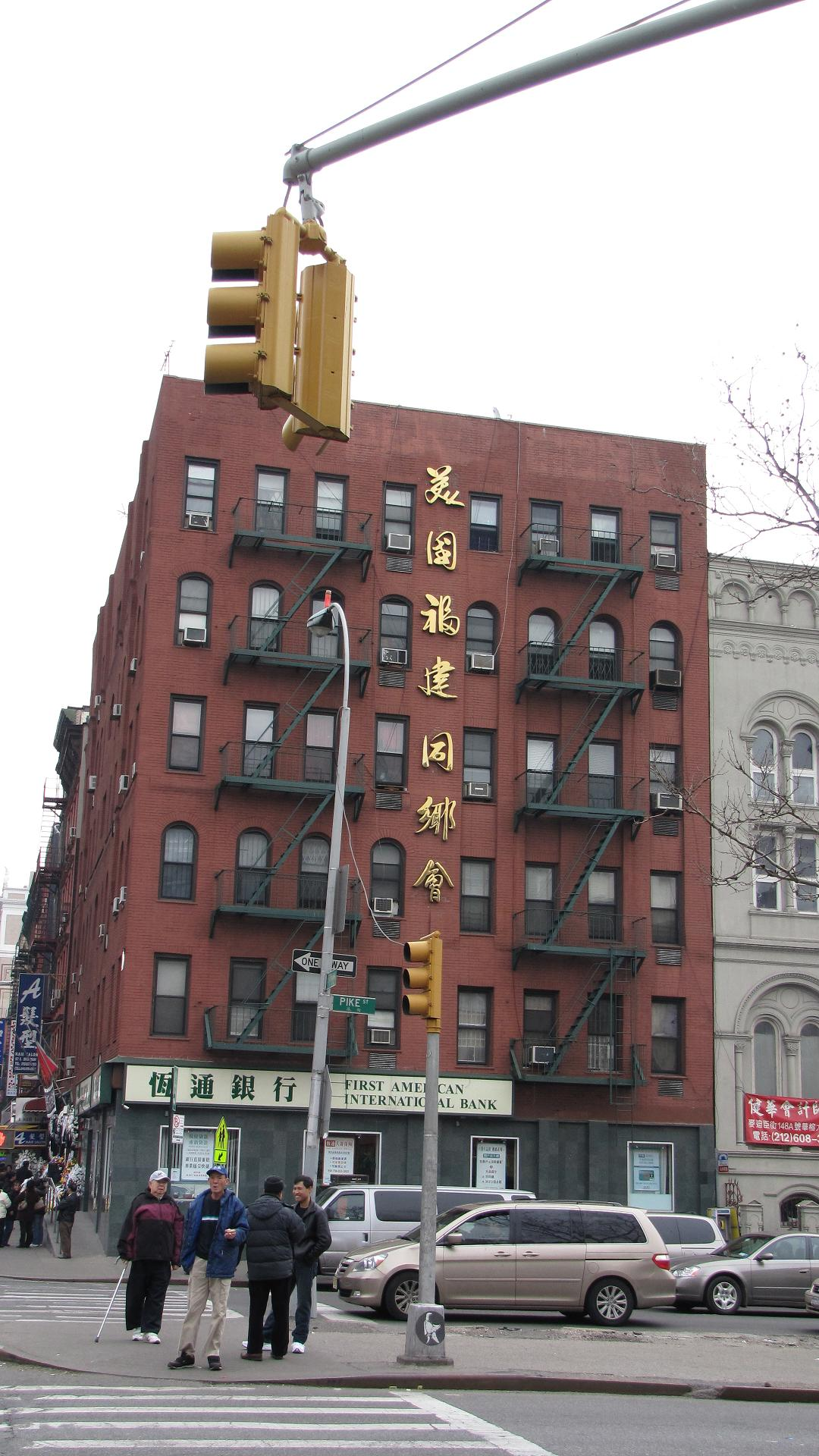
The Fukien American Association on East Broadway

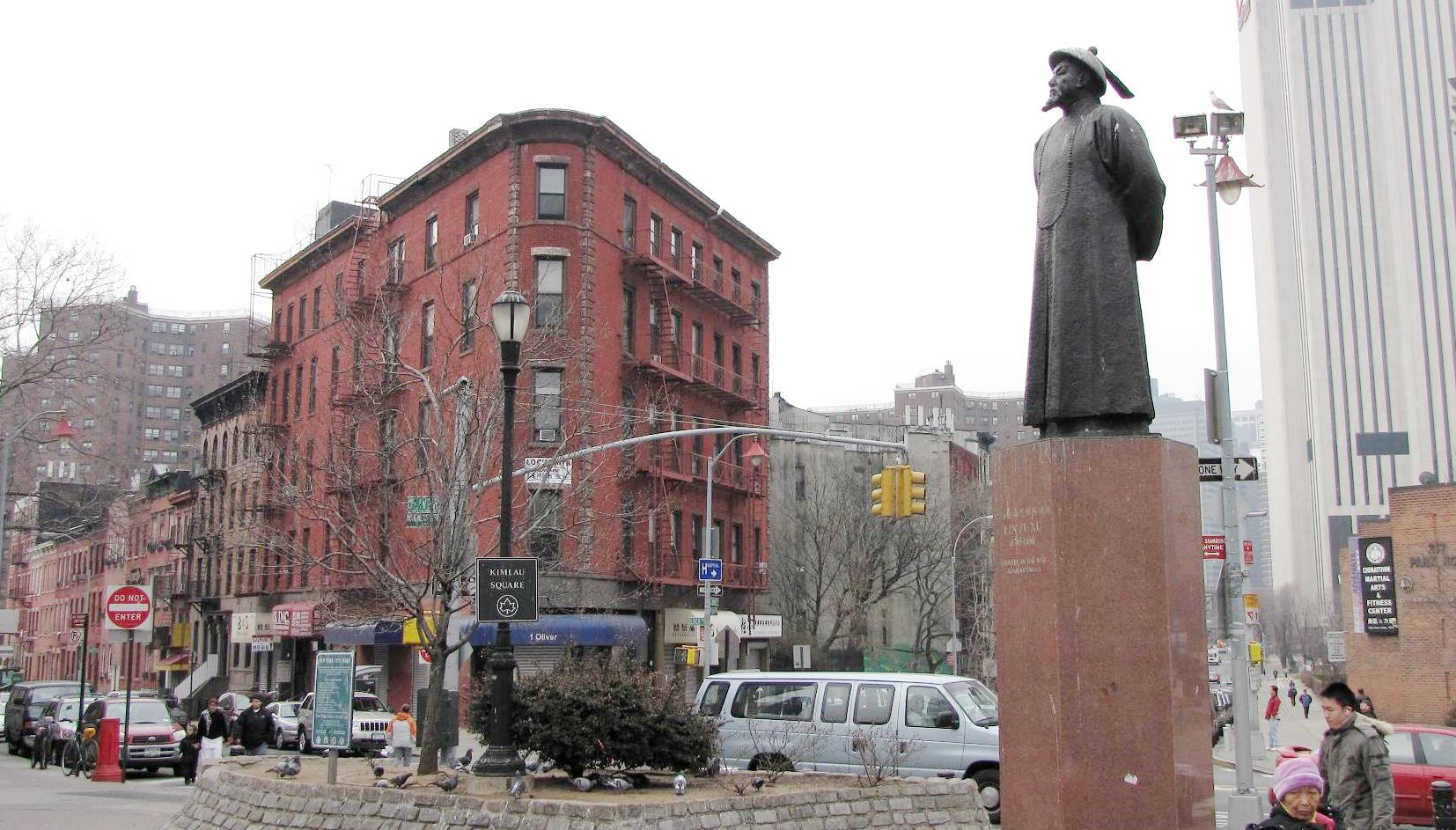
Chatham Square and Lin Zexu Statue

The earliest Fuzhou immigrants came illegally as early as the 1970s, starting mostly with men who later brought their families over. During the 1980s, an influx of illegal immigrants from Fuzhou—especially Changle, Fuqing, and Lianjiang—established the Little Fuzhou enclave on East Broadway. These immigrants could often speak Mandarin in addition to their native Fuzhou dialect. However, Manhattan's Chinatown had been traditionally dominated by Cantonese speakers; other Mandarin speakers settled in Flushing and Elmhurst, Queens.

During the influx of the 1980–90s, many Fuzhou immigrants were undocumented and unable to speak Cantonese; as such, many of them were denied jobs and resorted to criminal activities to make a living. In the late 20th century, Manhattan's Chinatown was unwelcoming toward non-Cantonese Chinese speakers, and immigrants from Fuzhou were largely forced to take low-wage, low-skilled jobs. During the 1980s, housing prices had dropped in Manhattan's Chinatown, but property values increased when Fuzhounese arrived in large numbers during the 1990s. An INS intelligence report estimates that in 1999, between 12,000 and 24,000 illegal Chinese entered the United States, of which more than 80 percent came from Fujian province.

Over time, Fuzhou immigrants created their own Chinatown east of the Bowery, separate from the Cantonese-dominated Chinatown west of the Bowery. By the early 21st century, Fujianese residents had spread from East Broadway out to Eldridge Street. With the development of Little Fuzhou, East Broadway gained prominence as a Chinese business district. In 2007, the NYCMA reported that Chinese landlords were illegally subdividing apartments into small spaces to rent to immigrants; this overcrowding was especially common on East Broadway.

With a large Fuzhou population, the East Broadway neighborhood is often referred to as Little Fuzhou by Fuzhou immigrants. A considerable number of Fujianese clan associations can be found in and around the street. A statue of the historical Fuzhounese politician Lin Zexu was erected in Chatham Square in 1997.

Despite the large Fuzhou population, the Cantonese still have a large presence on the Lower East Side. This influenced many Fuzhounese in Manhattan's Chinatown to learn the Cantonese language.

=== Gentrification and decline ===
In the 2000s, the growth of newly arriving Fuzhounese immigrants to Manhattan's Chinatown began to slow down, with more Fuzhounese moving to Brooklyn. Some Chinese landlords were also accused of bias against the Fuzhou immigrants due to crime concerns. Subdivision of apartments is also a frequent concern. During the 2010s, additional Fuzhounese immigrants moved out due to gentrification; in a July 2018 report from Voices of NY, Fuzhounese-owned businesses have been declining on East Broadway due to high rents, and are being replaced by non-Asians. In addition, Fuzhounese consumers started traveling for commerce to Flushing's Chinatown in Queens, and Sunset Park's Chinatown in Brooklyn. Since the COVID-19 pandemic in New York City in 2020, storefront vacancies have accelerated.

== Little Fuzhou, Brooklyn ==
The increasing Fuzhounese influx to New York City has shifted to the Brooklyn Chinatown (布鲁克林華埠) located in Brooklyn's Sunset Park neighborhood. This newer Chinatown had become the most affordable large Chinese enclave of New York City. In addition, the area supposedly had less housing discrimination than Manhattan's Chinatown. Brooklyn's Chinatown has surpassed Manhattan's Chinatown as the city's primary Fuzhou culture center. Property values have risen substantially as a result.

== Reputation as Chinatown's Wall Street ==
East Broadway has been called the "Wall Street of Chinatown", due to the significant number of Chinese-owned financial institutions concentrated on this street and surrounding streets.A Cantonese newspaper company named Wah May Press was also located on 9 East Broadway.

== Gangs ==
=== Cantonese gangs ===
In the late 20th century in Little Fuzhou, many gangs formed and became involved in organized crime such as drug trafficking, protection rackets, prostitution, and gambling—factions included the Ghost Shadows, Flying Dragons, Fuk Ching, and Gum Sing.

In 1973, Nei Wong, leader of the Ghost Shadows, was killed along with a Hong Kong police officer's girlfriend in the Chinese Quarter Nightclub near the Manhattan Bridge on East Broadway when the officer witnessed them together and shot them. With Nei Wong gone, Nicky Louie took over his spot in the Ghost Shadows gang.

On December 23, 1982, eleven members of the Chinese Freemasons, or Kam Lun association, were injured, with three of them killed, in a shootout in East Broadway while trying to expand their territory. This likely stemmed from a dispute that Freemasons leader Herbert Liu had with Benny Ong, leader of the Hip Sing (who were suspected of perpetuating the attack) and mentor of the Flying Dragons' leader. In particular, Liu's starting of a rival tong violated the oaths of loyalty he made when he had previously joined the Hip Sing, and he recruited Flying Dragons members who were expelled for unauthorized shakedowns. Despite this connection, police were unable to implicate Ong in the shootout, and the previously growing Freemasons gang disappeared afterwards.

In May 1985, there was a gang-related shooting outside of 30 East Broadway, which at the time was a Sichuan cuisine restaurant. The shooting eventually spilled over into the restaurant, injuring a 37-year-old non-Asian customer named Brian Monahan who was at the time an AT&T executive and had been dining with friends. A 4-year-old boy named Lee Young Kwai was strolling down the street with his uncle when they were caught in the crossfire, injuring Lee's skull. He eventually recovered after the bullet was surgically removed at Bellevue Hospital, while the uncle was not injured. A total of seven victims were injured in the crossfire of the shooting. Two males, who were 15 and 16 years old and were members of a Chinese street gang, were arrested and convicted. It was widely believed that Eastern Peace Gang and the Burmese Gang were the culprits, as many local residents reported that they were fighting over the surrounding territory.

=== Fuzhounese gangs ===
Fuzhou gangs dominated the emerging Fuzhou community in the 1990s, akin to how the tong gangs dominated the long-established Cantonese community in western Chinatown. Although the Fuzhou Gangs gained prevalence much later than the Cantonese gangs in Chinatown, they had been around as early as the 1980s. Their prevalence grew after the Freemasons' 1982 shootout and subsequent falling apart. Since the 2000s, Fuzhou gang activity has been dramatically shifting to Brooklyn's Chinatown, which is now the largest Fuzhou enclave of New York City.

Gang activity made Manhattan's Chinatown expand past its original borderline, further east onto the Lower East Side. A man named Alan Man Sin Lau, the leader of the Fukien American Association, gained a status like Benny Ong did with the Cantonese.

Known Fuzhou gangs include Fuk Ching, Tung On, and Snakehead. The Tung On gang was established in the 1980s–90s on East Broadway, where they ran a gambling parlor. Snakehead is known to smuggle illegal immigrants from Fuzhou to the United States and other countries. Fuk Ching gang members often worked for Snakehead, collecting money from illegal Fuzhou immigrants who borrowed from the Snakeheads to help them come to the United States. Sometimes, Fuk Ching gang members would hold immigrants hostage and even violently beat them until they paid up the loans they owed.

== See also ==
- Chinese Americans in New York City
- Fuzhounese Americans
- Chinatowns in the United States

== Sources ==
- Guest, Kenneth J. (August 2003). God in Chinatown: Religion and Survival in New York's Evolving Immigrant Community. NYU Press. ISBN 9780814731543.
- Keefe, Patrick Radden (2009). The Snakehead: An Epic Tale of the Chinatown Underworld and the American Dream. Doubleday. ISBN 9780385521307.
- Kwong, Peter (July 30, 1996). The New Chinatown. Farrar, Straus and Giroux. ISBN 9780809015856.
- Kyle, David; Koslowski, Rey (June 29, 2001). Global Human Smuggling: Comparative Perspectives. Johns Hopkins University Press. ISBN 9780801865909.
