= Chinese Museum =

Chinese Museum may refer to:

== France ==
- Chinese Museum (Fontainebleau), near Paris, France
- Musée Cernuschi, Paris, France

== United States ==
- Chinese American Museum, Los Angeles, California
- Chinese Historical Society of America, San Francisco, California
- Chinese American Museum of Chicago, Illinois
- Chinese Museum (Boston), Massachusetts
- Chinese Museum (Philadelphia), former museum in Pennsylvania
- Museum of Chinese in America, New York City
- Chinese American Museum DC, Washington, D.C.

== Elsewhere ==
- Chinese House (Potsdam), near Berlin, Germany
- Chinese Museum, Melbourne, Australia

== See also ==
- Chinese American Museum (disambiguation)
- List of museums in China
