= Chinese American Museum (disambiguation) =

The Chinese American Museum is a museum in Los Angeles, California.

Chinese American Museum may also refer to:

- Chinese American Museum of Chicago, Illinois
- Museum of Chinese in America, New York City
- Chinese American Museum DC, Washington, D.C.
- Chinese American Historical Museum, San Jose, California

== See also ==
- Chinese Museum (disambiguation), including several in America
