= Nancy Yao =

American museum administrator

Nancy Yao Maasbach (Chinese: 姚南薰; pinyin: Yao Nanxūn) is an American museum administrator who served as president of the Museum of Chinese in America from 2015 to 2023. She was formerly the executive director of the Yale-China Association.

== Life ==
Yao Nanxūn was born in the United States to Gong Tiānxiá (Tina) and Yao Ce (William Yao). She earned a B.A. in diplomacy and world affairs with a minor in Chinese language from Occidental College. She completed a M.B.A. degree at the Yale School of Management.

In 1997, Yao served as an associate producer for CNN International where she worked on handover of Hong Kong coverage. At Goldman Sachs, Yao worked in the investment banking division and the executive office in Hong Kong and New York. At the Council on Foreign Relations (CFR), she was an international affairs fellow in Japan and a research associate in China. She later served as the managing director of its corporate programs. She is a member of the CFR.

Yao served as the executive director of the Yale-China Association. Yao is a board secretary for Tessitura Network. Yao is a lecturer of theatre management at the David Geffen School of Drama at Yale University.

In February 2015, she became director and president of the Museum of Chinese in America. In March 2023, she was selected to succeed interim director Lisa Sasaki as the founding director of the Smithsonian American Women's History Museum. In July 2023, she later withdrew and was succeeded by interim director Melanie Adams. Yao's resignation came amid a review of how she had handled sexual harassment complaints, although Yao cited "family issues that require her attention" in deciding to withdraw from her designation as founding director of the Smithsonian American Women's History Museum.
