= Fay Chew Matsuda =

Chinese American museum curator and activist (1949–2020)

- Born: Fay Lai Chew; April 11, 1949; Manhattan, New York
- Died: July 24, 2020 (aged 71); Sound Beach, New York
- Education: Barnard College (BA); New York University (MSW)
- Occupation(s): Museum director, curator
- Organization: Museum of Chinese in America (1997–2006)
- Spouse: Karl Matsuda
- Children: Amy Matsuda

Fay Chew Matsuda, born Fay Lai Chew (Chinese: 陈丽妃; pinyin: Chén Lìfēi; April 11, 1949 – July 24, 2020), was a Chinese American museum curator and activist. She directed the Museum of Chinese in America from 1997 to 2006.

== Biography ==
Matsuda was born Fay Lai Chew, on April 11, 1949, in Manhattan to immigrants from Taishan, Guangdong. She grew up in East Village, Manhattan. Her father owned a hand-laundry north of the city in Ossining, New York, and a number of small businesses. Her mother was a garment worker on the Lower East Side. She graduated from Hunter College High School and received her BA in sociology from Barnard College in 1971. Her activism in the Chinese community in New York began in the Basement Workshop, an arts and activism organization that became a hub for the Asian American Movement on the East Coast. She later received her master's of social work from New York University.

Matsuda began her career as a social worker at Hamilton-Madison House, originally established on the Lower East Side to help acclimate Jewish and Italian immigrants and now serving a predominantly Asian and Latino constituency. She left to join the Chinatown History Project as executive director and was instrumental in transforming the project into the Museum of Chinese in America (MOCA). She later worked at the Chinatown Health Clinic, the Asian American Federation and the Brooklyn Children’s Museum. She was also a director of the Asian American Legal Defense and Education Fund during the 1980s and 1990s. Matsuda returned to MOCA to serve as executive director from 1997 to 2006. She then served as director of the Hamilton-Madison City Hall Senior Center before retiring in 2016.

Matsuda died on July 24, 2020, at her home in Sound Beach, New York, at age 71. She was married to Karl Matsuda. Together, they had one child, Amy Matsuda.
