= Kazuko Sinoto =

American historian (c. 1928 – 2013)

- Born: Osaka, Japan
- Occupations: Historian; immigration researcher

Kazuko Sinoto (c. 1928 – August 5, 2013) was a Japanese-born American historian and immigration researcher who specialized in the history of Japanese migration to Hawaii. Her best known works included "A Pictorial History of the Japanese in Hawaii 1885-1924," co-written with Dr. Franklin Odo. The pictorial history was published in 1985 to mark the 100th anniversary of the first Japanese contract immigrant laborers to Hawaii.

== Biography ==
Sinoto was born Kazuko Sato in Osaka, Japan, to Shigeomi and Kinuko Sato. In 1957, Sinoto, who had married Yosihiko H. Sinoto, emigrated to Hawaii with their son, Akihiko. She was married to Yosihiko H. Sinoto, an anthropologist of Hawaii and the Pacific Islands, for 64 years, until her death in 2013. Kazuko Sinoto gained permanent residency in the United States in 1966 and became a U.S. citizen in 1982.

Kazuko Sinoto was a housewife for five years after her arrival in Hawaii. She then took a job at the Bishop Museum's bookstore and gift shop in Honolulu. In 1976, the Hawai'i Immigrant Heritage Preservation Center was opened at the Bishop Museum. Sinoto left her position with the bookstore to become a staff member at the museum's newly established immigration center. She soon specialized in the history of the Japanese in Hawaii. Sinoto collected, cataloged and displayed artifacts related to the Japanese Americans for more than 37 years. Many of the items and documents were acquired and donated from the public. Additionally, Sinoto oversaw the creation of exhibitions on the Japanese and other ethnic groups in Hawaii.

In 1985, Sinoto published her best known work, A Pictorial History of the Japanese in Hawaii 1885-1924. The book, which was co-authored with Dr. Franklin Odo, was released to coincide with the anniversary of the arrival of the first Japanese contract workers in Hawaii in 1885. Sinoto researched Japanese-language newspapers for eight years to compile sources for the book. She also wrote the captions and acquired the book's photographs and other illustrations.

Sinoto became a consultant after leaving the Bishop Museum and continued her research on the Japanese in Hawaii. She was a founding member of the Joseph Heco Society of Hawaii. During her later life, Sinoto worked to digitize the entire Bishop Museum Hawaii Japanese Immigrant Collection, which consists of more than 13,000 documents, books, photographs, and other objects.

Sinoto died at her home following a two-month illness on August 5, 2013, at the age of 85. She was survived by her husband of 64 years, anthropologist Yosihiko H. Sinoto; their son, Akihiko; her sister, Kyoko Tremblais; and three grandchildren, Luke Kaneko, Laurent (Brandy), and Leigh.
