= Harry Urata =

Japanese American musicologist

Harry Minoru Urata (浦田ハリー實) (1917 – October 23, 2009) was a music teacher best known for preserving the Holehole bushi, a type of folk song sung by Japanese immigrants in Hawaii's sugar plantations.

== Early life and education ==
Urata was born in Honolulu in 1917. After his father died in a car accident, Urata was sent to Japan in 1924 to be raised by his relatives in Kumamoto prefecture. He briefly also lived in Japan-occupied Korea, and was admitted to Waseda University after high school. However, he did not have a chance to study there because in 1937 he returned to Hawaii at his mother's insistence, as the threat of war in Japan increased.

After returning to Hawaii in 1937, Urata became a teacher at a Japanese language school. He also enrolled in the Mid-Pacific Institute to learn English. Soon after he was admitted into the University of Hawaii, Pearl Harbor was attacked and World War II began in the Pacific. In March 1943, he was arrested by the FBI and imprisoned at the Honouliuli Internment Camp. While there, he befriended Kenpu Kawazoe, a journalist who sparked Urata's interest in the Holehole bushi. Urata was later transferred to the Tule Lake War Relocation Center.

== Career ==
After he was released from Tule Lake, Urata returned to Hawaii in December 1945. He sold newspapers for a while, then was hired to do Japanese music programming at KULA, a local radio station. He also reformed his pre-war music group, the Shinko Orchestra, to play for weddings and parties. He then studied with Masao Koga in Japan for a year and a half before starting his own music studio, where he taught hundreds of students.

Urata worked with Raymond Hattori in 1960 to create a score for the Holehole bushi. However, because they had based their score on one person's rendition of the genre, many singers were upset. Urata decided to gather more recordings of Holehole bushi. He released a record of them in 1967. He collected recordings until the 1980s, when he gave his collection to Franklin Odo, who in turn gave it to the Smithsonian Center for Folklife and Cultural Heritage.

Urata died on October 23, 2009. Before he died he was presented with awards from the governments of both the United States and Japan.

In 2025, a selection of Utara's field recordings from between 1960 and 1980 were selected by the Library of Congress for preservation in the National Recording Registry.
