= Franklin Odo =

Japanese American author, scholar, activist, and historian

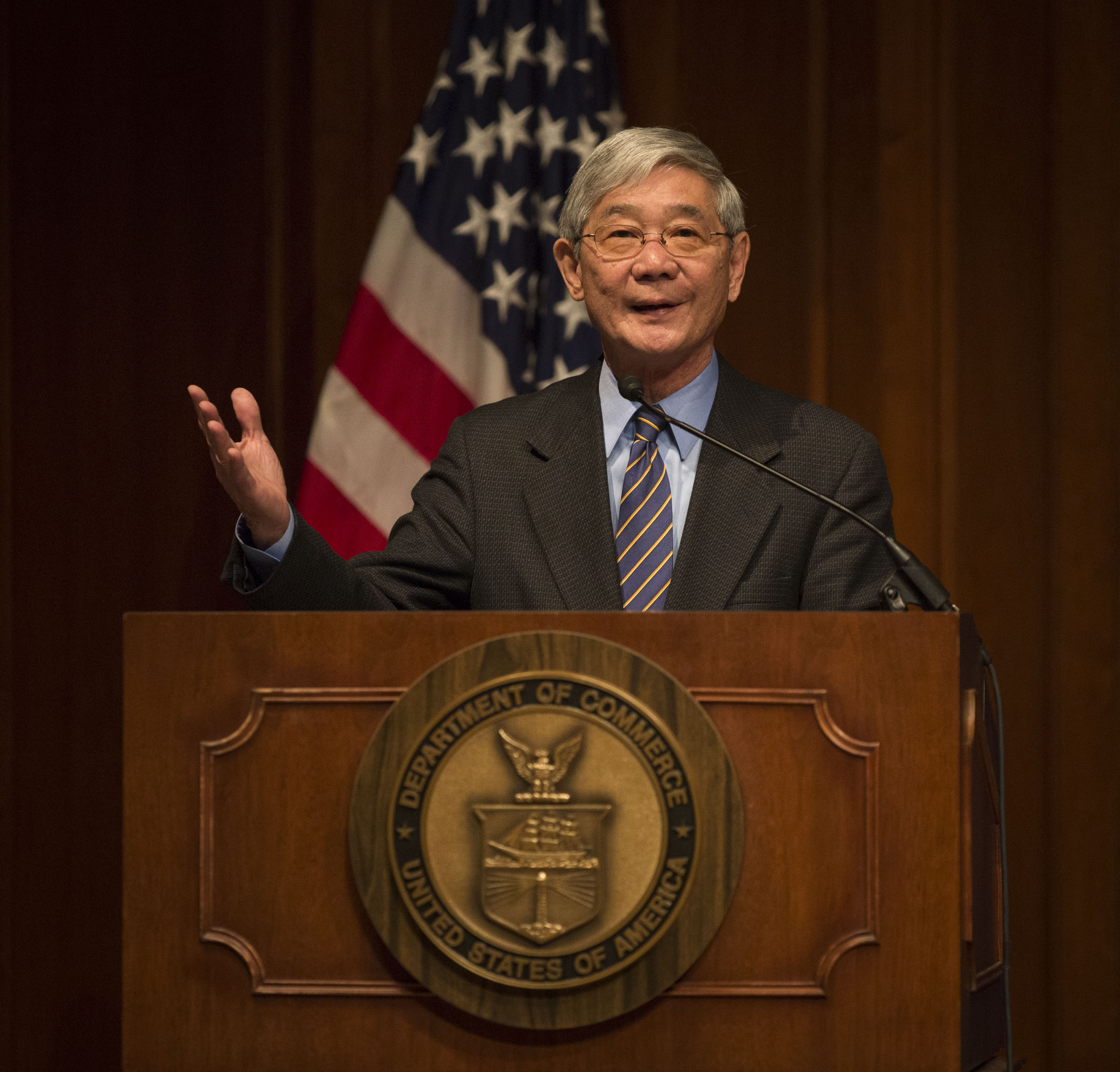
- Odo in 2015
- Born: May 6, 1939; Honolulu, Hawaii, U.S.
- Died: September 28, 2022 (aged 83); Amherst, Massachusetts, U.S.
- Education: Princeton University (BA, PhD); Harvard University (MA)
- Occupations: Historian; author; curator; academic
- Employers: Smithsonian Institution; Amherst College; University of Hawaiʻi at Mānoa
- Known for: Founding Director of the Smithsonian Asian Pacific American Center; President of the Association for Asian American Studies; Author of No Sword to Bury
- Spouse: Enid Reid

Franklin S. Odo (May 6, 1939 – September 28, 2022) was a Japanese American author, scholar, activist, and historian. Odo served as the director of the Asian Pacific American Program at the Smithsonian Institution from the program's inception in 1997 until his retirement in 2010. As the director of the APA Program, Odo brought numerous exhibits to the Smithsonian highlighting the experiences of Chinese Americans, Native Hawaiians, Japanese Americans, Filipino Americans, Vietnamese Americans, Korean Americans, and Indian Americans. He was the first Asian Pacific American curator at the National Museum of American History. He taught American Studies at Amherst College until his death.

== Background ==
Franklin Odo was born in and grew up in Honolulu, Hawaii and was the first from Kaimuki High School to attend Princeton University, where he received his B.A. in History in 1961 and took meals at the Ivy Club. He then received his M.A. in East Asia regional studies at Harvard University in 1963. He returned to Princeton University, where he completed a doctorate dissertation on Japanese feudalism in 1975.

While his academic background and training had been in traditional Asian Studies, Odo became involved in the movement that created Asian American Studies and other ethnic studies in California in the late 1960s and early 1970s as a result of the anti-war and anti-racism activism in the United States.

Odo has taught for over 50 years at numerous academic institutions, most recently at Amherst College and the University of Maryland, College Park. In the 1960s and 1970s, Odo taught at Occidental College; the University of California, Los Angeles; and California State University, Long Beach. In the 1990s, he served as a visiting professor at the University of Pennsylvania, Hunter College, Princeton University, and Columbia University. He has also served as the director of ethnic studies at the University of Hawaiʻi at Mānoa. From 1989 to 1991, he also served as the President of the Association for Asian American Studies (AAAS).

== Director of Smithsonian Asian Pacific American Center ==
Since its formation in 1997, the Smithsonian Asian Pacific American Center (APAC) has provided vision, leadership, and support for Asian Pacific American activities at the Smithsonian, while also serving as the Smithsonian's liaison to APA communities. Odo was selected in 1997 to serve as the director of the program, and throughout his tenure, he has brought attention to Asian Pacific American culture and arts to various Smithsonian exhibits. Some of his efforts include a photo exhibit entitled "Through My Father’s Eyes," which featured Filipino American photographer Ricardo Alvarado at the National Museum of American History. In 2003, Odo co-organized a traveling exhibit of Korean American contemporary artists entitled "Dreams & Reality." He has also led projects to commemorate the centennial of Filipino immigration to the United States, and is the co-curator of “Exit Saigon, Enter Little Saigon,” a project that highlights the growth of the Vietnamese American community after the 30th anniversary of the fall of Saigon. Odo retired from his director position in January 2010.

== Published work ==
Along with Amy Tachiki, Eddie Wong, and Buck Wong, Odo co-edited the first breakthrough Asian American anthology Roots: An Asian American Reader (1971).

In 1985, Odo and immigration researcher, Kazuko Sinoto, co-authored and published A Pictorial History of the Japanese in Hawai‘i 1885-1924, which opens with the experiences of the first Japanese immigrants to Hawai'i and ends with the 1924 exclusionary laws that effectively denied further Japanese entry into the United States.

In 2003, Odo authored No Sword to Bury: Japanese Americans in Hawai’i During World War II, which explores the experiences of a shrinking group of Japanese American men who survived World War II as part of the Varsity Victory Volunteers (VVV).

He is also the editor of the Columbia Documentary History of the Asian American Experience (2003), the first book that brought together the canon of various documents pertinent to Asian Pacific American history.

Odo wrote Voices from the Canefields: folksongs from Japanese immigrant workers in Hawaii, which is about the Holehole bushi, a kind of folk song sung by Japanese plantation workers. He used Harry Urata's collection of Holehole bushi recordings to write the book.

== Awards ==
Odo was awarded the President's Award by the Japanese American Citizens League in July 2008, an award from the Organization of Chinese Americans in August 2008, and the Association for Asian American Studies Lifetime Achievement Award on April 14, 2012.
