= Herb Tam =

Director of Museum of Chinese in America

- Born: August 3, 1974 (age 52); Hong Kong, China

Chinese name
- Traditional Chinese: 譚海俊
- Simplified Chinese: 谭海俊
Transcriptions
Yue: Cantonese
- Jyutping: Taam4 Hoi2zeon3

Herb Tam (born in Hong Kong) is the curator and director of exhibitions at the Museum of Chinese in America located in Manhattan's Chinatown. He is also the Co-Founder of Chinatown Basketball Club

== Education and early career ==
Tam born (August 3, 1974) in Hong Kong and raised in the San Francisco Bay Area. He attended San Jose State University and has an MFA in Fine Arts from New York City's School of Visual Arts.

Prior to MOCA, he was an independent curator of contemporary art working in New York City with institutions such as the Queens Museum of Art, Exit Art, the Asia Society, Creative Capital Foundation and the New York Foundation for the Arts.
