= Smithsonian Asian Pacific American Center =

Asian Pacific American museum

The Smithsonian Asian Pacific American Center (APAC) is a migratory museum that shares Asian Pacific American history, art, and culture through innovative museum experiences online and throughout the U.S through the Smithsonian Institution's work. The center was established in 1997 and does not feature a museum building for public display; instead, the institution manifests its work through community engagement.

Through exhibitions, programs, research, and collaboration, the APA Center seeks to improve the public's appreciation of the roles of APAs in the history of the nation and empower APA communities by increasing their sense of inclusion into the national culture. The center has provided leadership, vision, and support for APA activities at the Smithsonian and has also served as the Smithsonian's liaison to APA communities. The center's founding director, Dr. Franklin Odo, retired in January 2010. Konrad Ng served as director from 2011 to 2015. Lisa Sasaki was appointed director in November 2016.

== History ==
In 1997, the Smithsonian Asian Pacific American Center established an advisory group headed by Norman Y. Mineta with a mandate to research, deliberate, and then report to Secretary I. Michael Heyman on the Institution's ability to increase and diffuse knowledge about the nation's richly diverse APA communities.

The Asian Pacific American National Advisory Group's final report, released in June 1998, called for the creation of a program for Asian Pacific American Studies. This central program would provide vision, leadership, and support for all APA activities at the Smithsonian, while serving as a liaison to APA communities.

The Smithsonian Asian Pacific American Center has had significant impact on how the Smithsonian, the world’s largest museum complex, is evolving to better reflect the diversity of our nation of immigrants and indigenous peoples. Since its inception, the Smithsonian’s APA Program has sponsored more than a dozen successful exhibitions featuring Japanese, Chinese, Filipino, Indian and Vietnamese Americans, to name a few ethnic groups.

In 2017, the institution published the "Culture Lab Manifesto," which highlights its mission to provide a glimpse into "experiential friction between guests and hosts, history and future." There have been three Culture Labs to date in 2019.

== Exhibitions ==
- 'Ae Kai: A Culture Lab on Convergence
- CrossLines: A Culture Lab on Intersectionality
- CTRL+ALT: A Culture Lab on Imagined Futures
- Beyond Bollywood: Indian Americans Shape the Nation
- I Want the Wide American Earth: An Asian Pacific American Story
- Portraiture Now: Asian American Portraits of Encounter
- Sweet and Sour
- Singgalot: The Ties that Bind
- Exit Saigon, Enter Little Saigon
- Creating Hawaii
- Barriers to Bridges
- Gliding to Golden Vistory—Apolo Ohno's skates
- Japanese American Pioneers of the Jet Age
- Through my Father's Eyes
- Miracle under the Waves
- Do-Ho Suh's Staircase IV
- Dreams and Reality
- A More Perfection Union
- Kaho'olawe: Ke Aloha Kupa'a I Ka'Aina
- On Gold Mountain
- Gateway to Gold Mountain
- Fly to Freedom
- From Bento to Mixed Plate
- Sightlines: Chinatown and Beyond
