= Yosihiko H. Sinoto =

Japanese-American anthropologist (1924–2017)

- Born: September 3, 1924
- Died: October 4, 2017 (aged 93); Honolulu, Hawaii, U.S.
- Education: University of Hawaiʻi alumni Hokkaido University; University of California
- Scientific career
- Fields: Anthropology
- Institutions: Bishop Museum

Yosihiko H. Sinoto (September 3, 1924 – October 4, 2017) was a Japanese-born American anthropologist at the Bishop Museum in Honolulu, Hawaii. He is known for his anthropological expeditions throughout the Pacific, particularly Hawaii and French Polynesia.

== Biography ==
Sinoto was born in Tokyo in 1924. After World War II ended, he went to study at the University of California, but was recruited to be anthropologist Kenneth Emory's research assistant before he got there. In 1954 he moved to Hawaii, where he began his archaeological work at South Point on Hawaii. In 1960 he went to Tahiti, in French Polynesia.

He graduated as Bachelor of Arts at the University of Hawaiʻi in 1958 and he acquired his DSc at the University of Hokkaido in Japan in 1962.

In 1964-5 he excavated Hane in the Marquesas Islands, where he discovered more than 12,000 bird bones. Nearly 10,000 of them are reported to belong to about seven species of shearwaters and petrels. On the island of Huahine, where he worked for 40 years, he helped to restore and preserve the prehistoric village of Maeva with its temple ruins, or marae. In 1977 he discovered the remnants of a deep-sea voyaging canoe. Sinoto's further expeditions led him to the Society Islands, Marquesas, Tuamotus and others, where he studied the settlements, artifacts, migration patterns and Polynesian cultural ties.

Though he officially retired in 2013, Sinoto continued to work until his death on October 4, 2017.

Yosihiko Sinoto's wife, Kazuko Sinoto, who died in 2013, was a historian of Japanese immigration. His son, Akihiko, was an archaeologist at the Bishop Museum.

== Honors ==
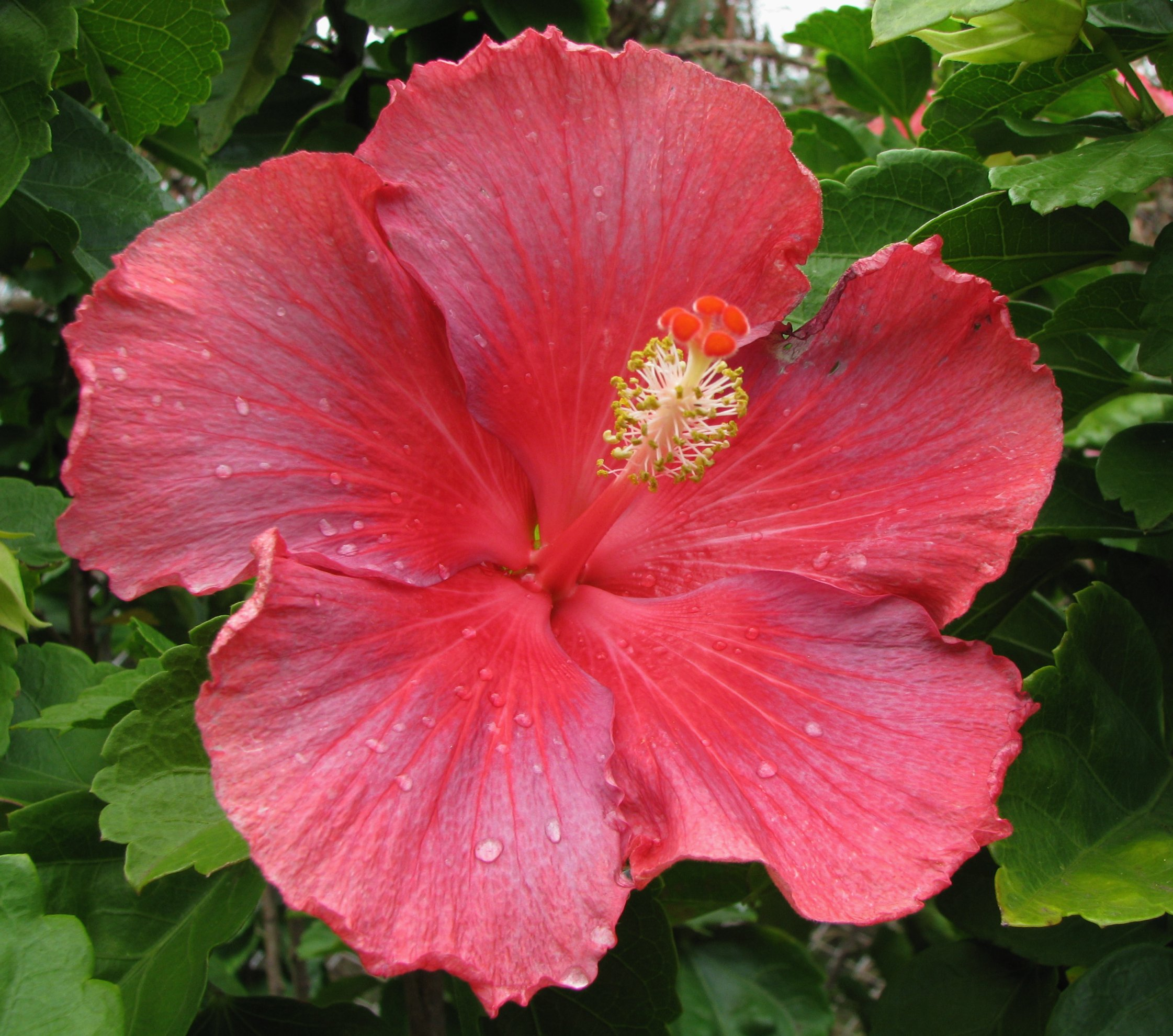
Hibiscus Sir Yosihiko Sinoto, a hybrid created by Jill Coryell to honor Sinoto, was unveiled in 2007.

Sinoto is honored as a Tahitian chevalier (knight) of the Order of Tahiti Nui in 2000 and the Japanese Order of the Rising Sun, Gold and Silver Rays. He also was awarded the Society of Hawaiian Archaeology's Nakiʻikeaho Cultural Stewardship Award, the Bishop Museum's Robert J. Pfeiffer Medal, and the Historic Hawaii Foundation's lifetime achievement award. He was also named a Living Treasure of Hawaii.

Sinoto's lorikeet (Vini sinotoi), an extinct lorikeet species in the Marquesas Islands, and Sir Yosihiko Sinoto, a hybrid variety of hibiscus, are both named for him.

== Bibliography ==
- Emory, Kenneth P.; Sinoto, Yosihiko H. (1969). "Age of the sites in the South Point area, Ka'u, Hawaii". Pacific Anthropological Records (8). ISSN 0078-740X. LCCN 71029054. OCLC 659366796.
