= Smithsonian American Women's History Museum =

Planned museum

- Established: December 27, 2020
- Type: History Museum
- Founder: U.S. Congress
- Directors: Elizabeth Babcock, PhD
- Chairperson: Jane Abraham Penny Pritzker
- Website: womenshistory.si.edu

The Smithsonian American Women's History Museum is a proposed Smithsonian Institution museum dedicated to women's history, to be located in Washington, DC. The museum was established by Congress in 2020. Development of the museum is expected to take at least ten years.

== History ==
The museum was established by Congress as part of the Consolidated Appropriations Act, 2021, which became law on December 27, 2020. Lisa Sasaki was appointed as the museum's first interim director in March 2021. Elizabeth C. Babcock was publicly named the museum's director in March 2024 and assumed the role in June of the same year. On August 6, 2025, it was announced that Babcock would be stepping down from her role as director of the museum to become President and CEO of the Adler Planetarium.

In August 2021, the Smithsonian Board of Regents established an advisory council for the planning, design, fundraising, and development of the museum. Founding members of the council include Secretary of the Smithsonian Lonnie Bunch, fashion designer Tory Burch, actress Lynda Carter, and tennis champion Billie Jean King.

On March 27, 2025, President Donald Trump issued an executive order focused on making changes to the Smithsonian Institution and singling out the Smithsonian American Women's History Museum along with the National Museum of African American History and Culture and the American Art Museum for "divisive narratives that distort our shared history", threatening to withhold future funding for "exhibits or programs that degrade shared American values" or "divide Americans based on race." This included a ban on certain topics regarding gender and race, as well the existence and history of trans women, explicitly prohibiting the American Women's History Museum from recognizing trans women "in any respect".

== Activities ==
The museum holds Wikipedia Edit-a-thons to expand the coverage of women's history, offering editing training with the help of Wikimedia DC.
