= Chinese Museum (Fontainebleau) =

Section of the Palace of Fontainebleau in France

Coordinates: 48.4°N 2.701°E

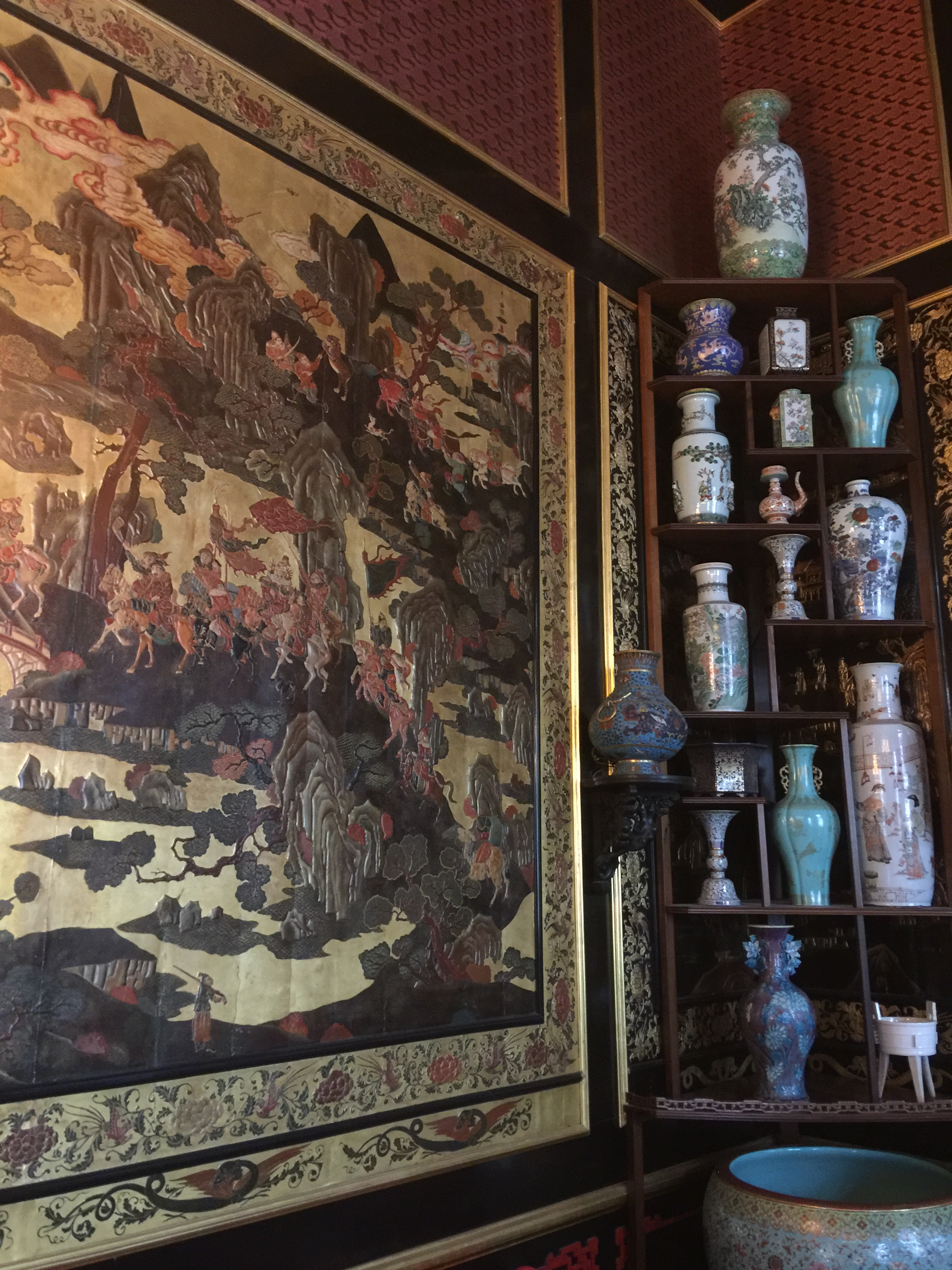
Objects at the Chinese Museum

The Chinese Museum or musée chinois is a section of the Palace of Fontainebleau that keeps artifacts from Qing dynasty China, the Kingdom of Siam, and other Asian countries, including diplomatic gifts and plunder from the Second Opium War. Opened in 1863 by Empress Eugénie, it is one of the world's oldest museums specifically dedicated to Asian art.

== Background ==
France significantly increased its diplomatic and military activism in Asia during the Second Empire, after a century-long pause following its decisive defeat by Great Britain during the Seven Years' War. It joined the United Kingdom and participated in the Second Opium War between 1856 and 1860, including the looting of the Old Summer Palace in Beijing in October 1860. Also in 1856, Napoleon III sent Charles de Montigny on an envoy (emissary) to King Mongkut of the Rattanakosin Kingdom of Siam, reviving high-level diplomatic contacts that had flourished at the time of Louis XIV and King Narai of the Ayutthaya Kingdom during the 1680s. In 1858, Napoleon III's representatives concluded the Treaty of Amity and Commerce between France and Japan, and separately the French military started the Cochinchina campaign, establishing a foothold in what is now Southern Vietnam. In 1863, France went on to establish a protectorate in Cambodia, and in 1866 it launched its ill-fated expedition to Korea. In 1867 the Exposition Universelle would trigger a fashion and artistic frenzy for Japonisme.

In 1861 King Mongkut of Siam sent an envoy in return, which was ceremonially received on 27 June 1861 by Napoleon III and Empress Eugénie in the great 16th-century ballroom of the Palace of Fontainebleau, that was one of their favorite residences.

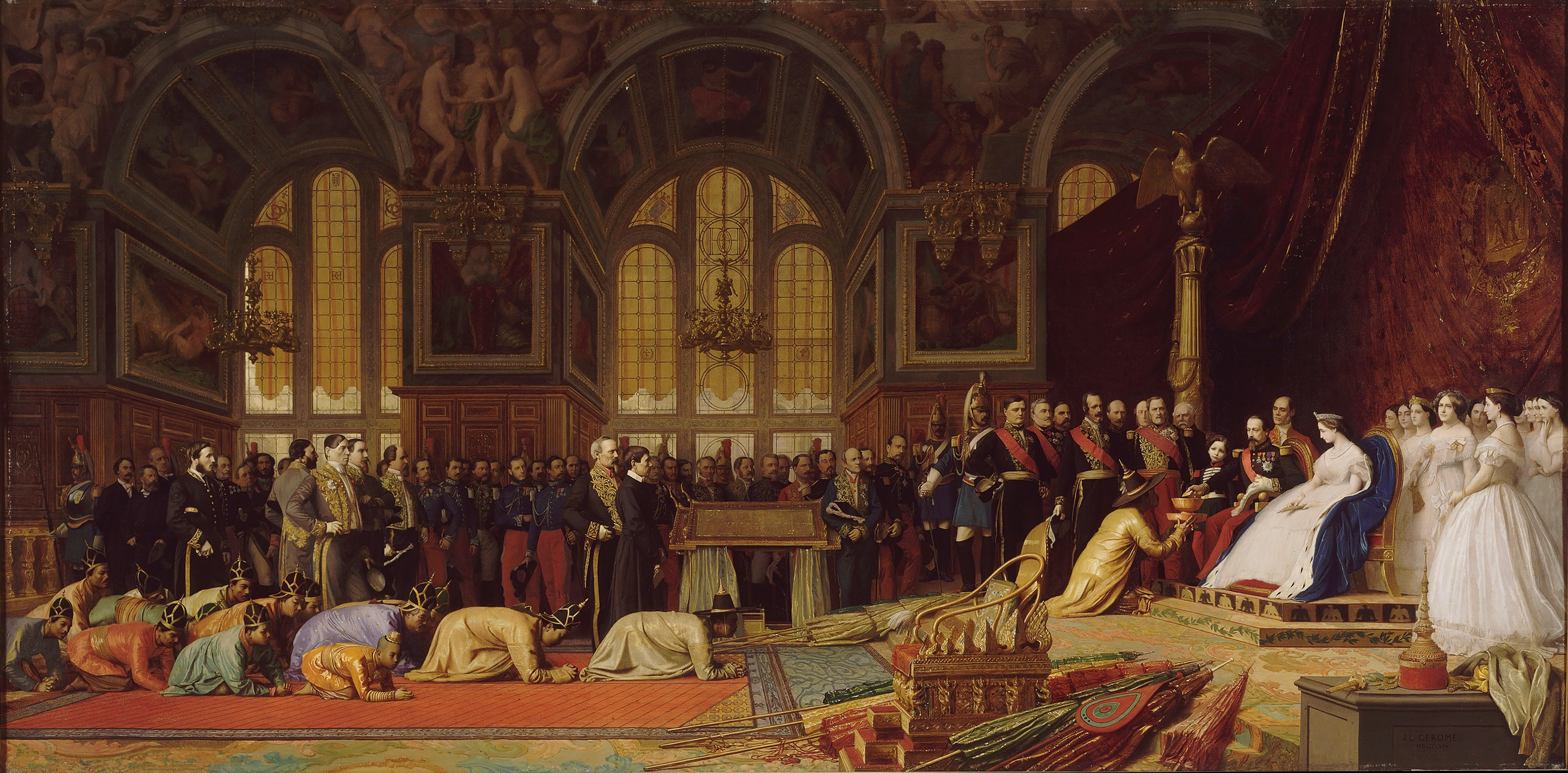
Réception des ambassadeurs siamois par Napoléon III et l'Impératrice Eugénie dans la grande salle de bal Henri II du château de Fontainebleau, le 27 juin 1861 ("Napoleon III and Empress Eugénie receiving the Siamese ambassadors at the palace of Fontainebleau in 1861"), 1864 painting by Jean-Léon Gérôme; deposit of the Musée de l'Histoire de France (Versailles) at the Palace of Fontainebleau.

== History ==
About 300 or 400 objects from the Beijing Summer Palace looting of 1860, carried out by the French military), many dating from the reign of the Qianlong Emperor, were presented by French officers to the Imperial household as a personal gift. They were initially displayed at the Imperial apartment at the Tuileries Palace. Eugénie combined some of them with the Siam embassy gifts of 1861 to form the core of the Asian art collection she would display in Fontainebleau, which she complemented with other diplomatic and non-diplomatic gifts, objects confiscated by the state during the French Revolution and kept since then at the National Library, and acquisitions she made on the art market using the Imperial household's personal budget. In addition to Chinese and Siamese artifacts she added objects from Cambodia, Japan, Korea, and Tibet.

Eugénie intended the museum as a private space where she would entertain guests and friends, rather than a public exhibition space. She located it on the ground floor of the gros pavillon, a garden-facing building of the palace. The rooms were redecorated by palace architect Alexis Paccard. The main exhibition room is decorated with lacquer and 18th-century folding screen panels. The adjacent drawing room includes a billiard table and a piano for entertainment. The whole suite was inaugurated by the empress on 14 June 1863.

The museum has been preserved in a layout largely similar to that of the 1860s. In 1905, it received additional objects from the ethnographical collections of the Musée de Marine, then hosted in the Louvre and short of space there. It was renovated in 1988.

== Robberies ==
There was a robbery at the museum in 1995, with fifteen objects stolen of which nine were later recovered.

In the early hours of 1 March 2015, the museum was robbed of 15-20 precious Chinese and Siamese objects, including a ceremonial crown that was the centerpiece of the Siamese gift package of 1861.

In a 2018 article published in GQ, journalist Alex W. Palmer suggests a connection between the 2015 robbery and the longstanding promotion by the Chinese party/state of emotional grievances about the Second Opium War and especially the objects looted from the Old Summer Palace.

Yet another robbery attempt was stopped by authorities in 2019.

== Gallery ==
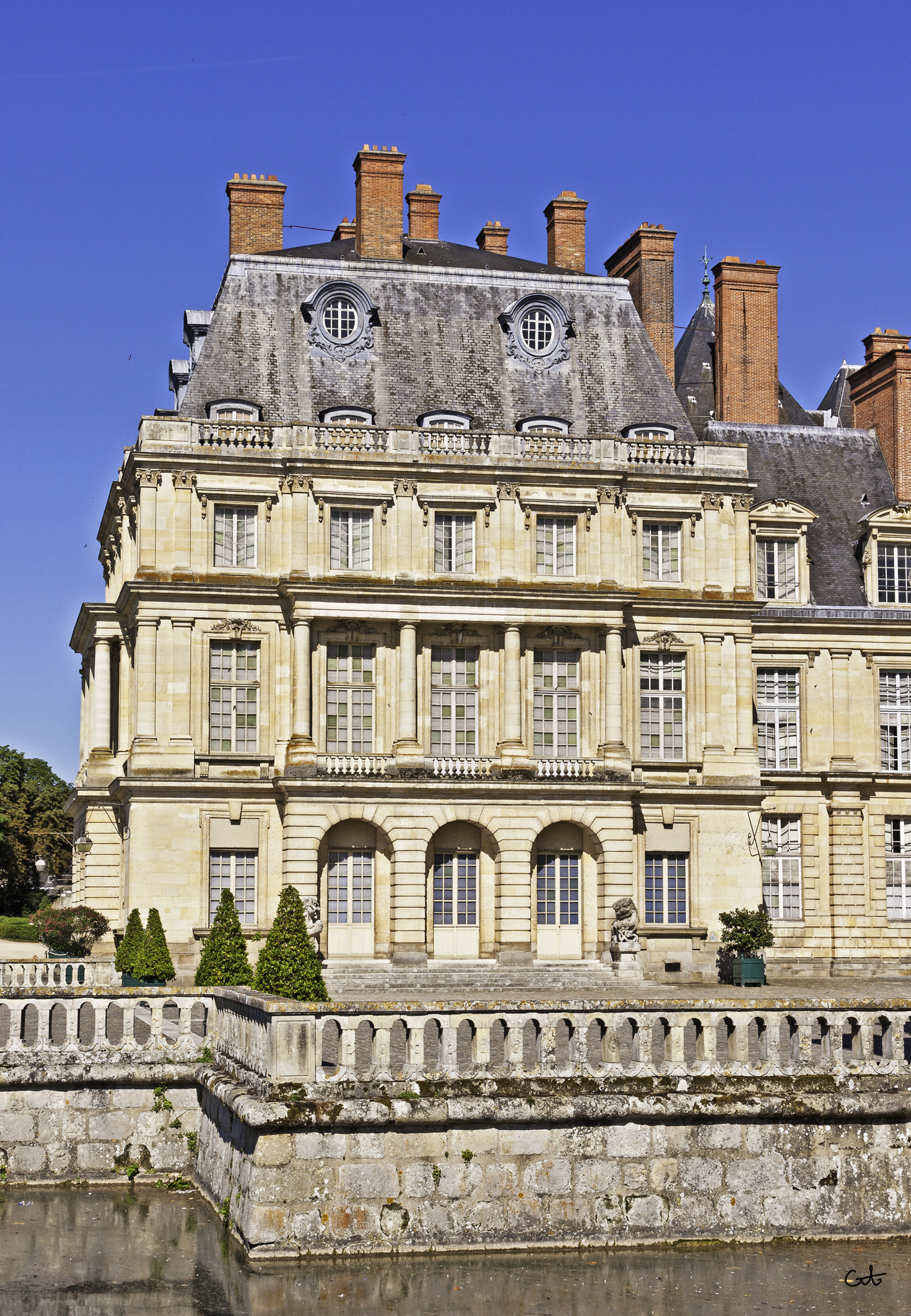
The gros pavillon houses the Chinese Museum on its ground floor

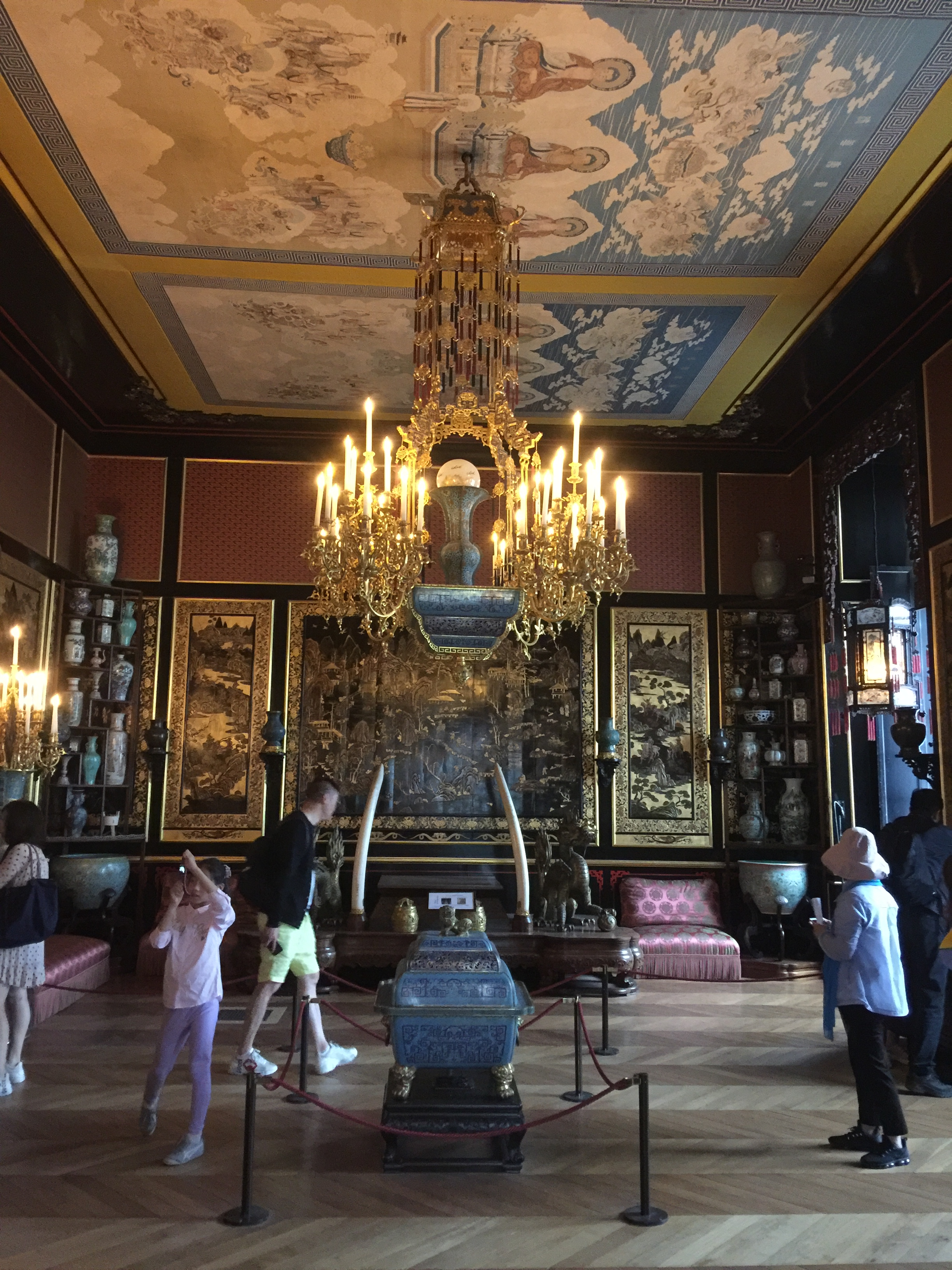
Main exhibition room

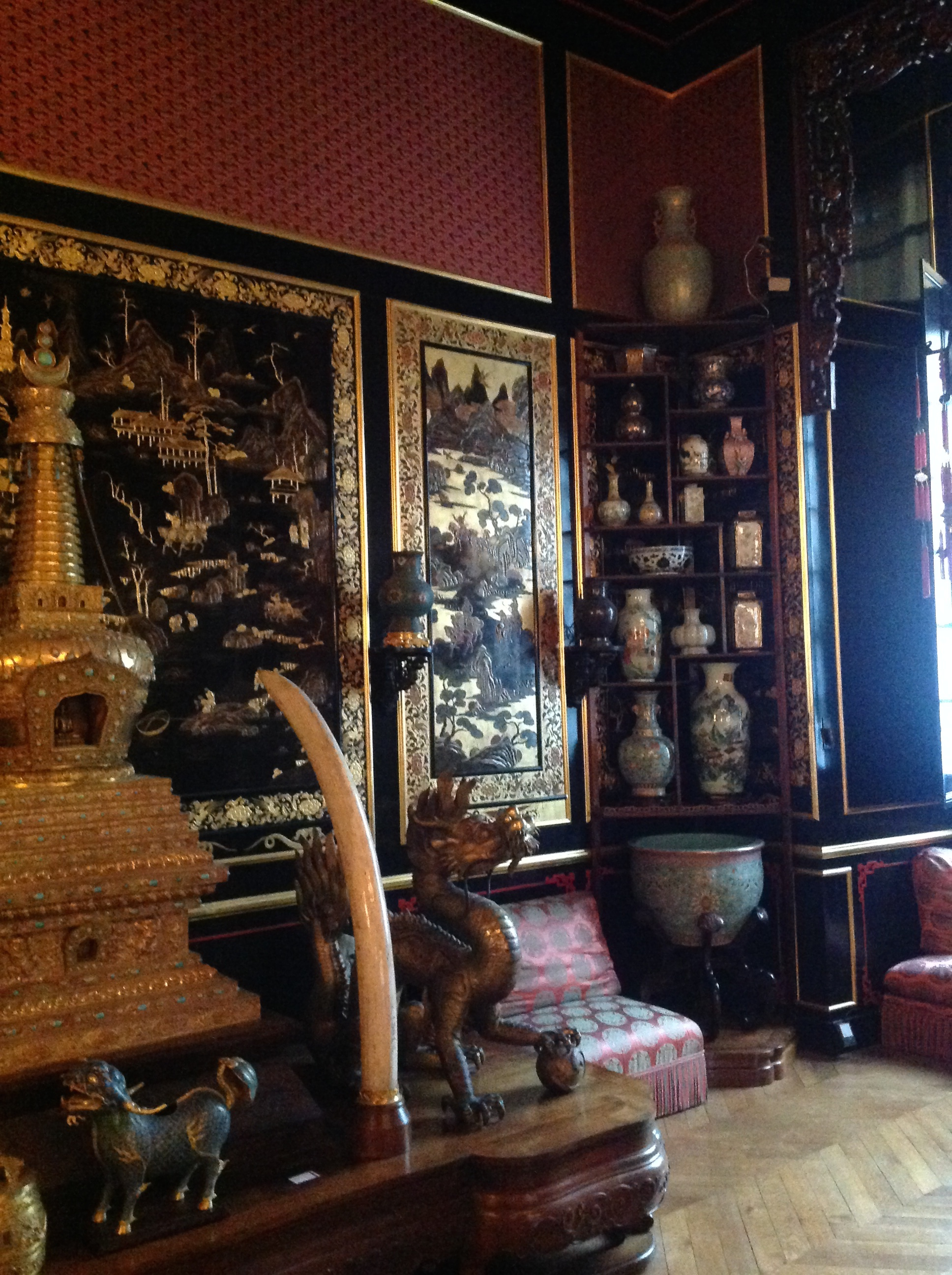
Exhibits in the Chinese Museum

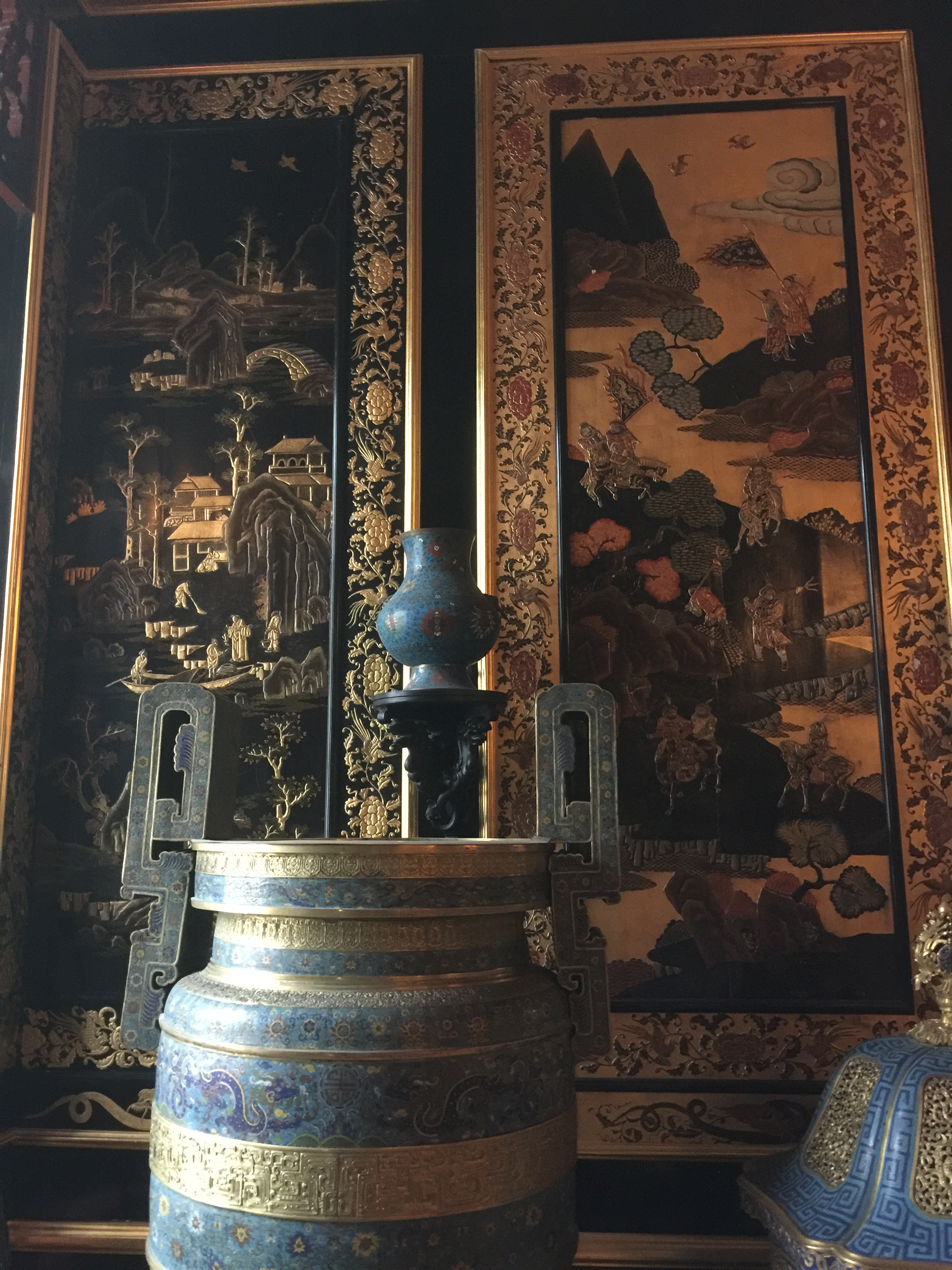
Details of exhibits

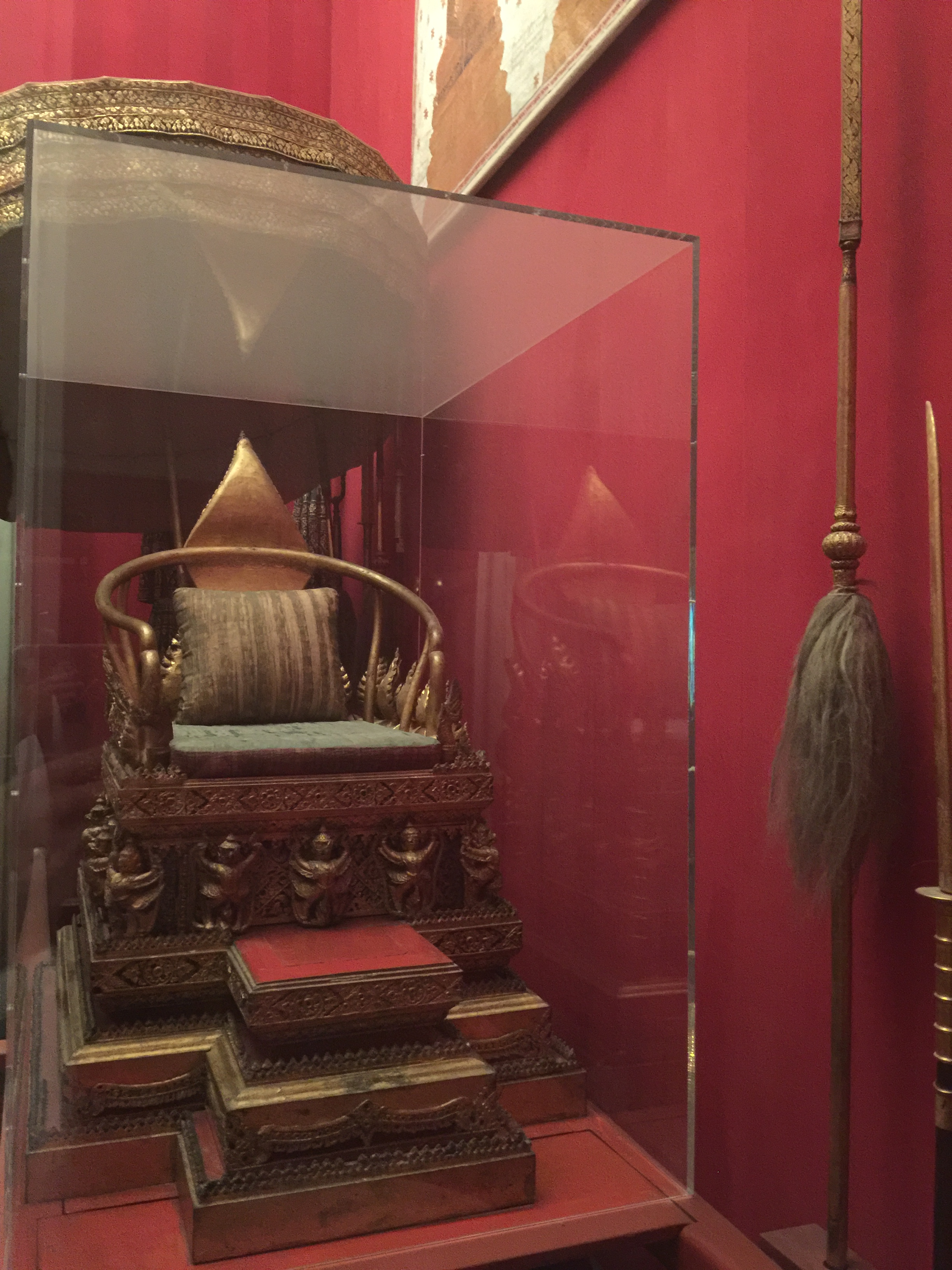
Royal palanquin from Siam

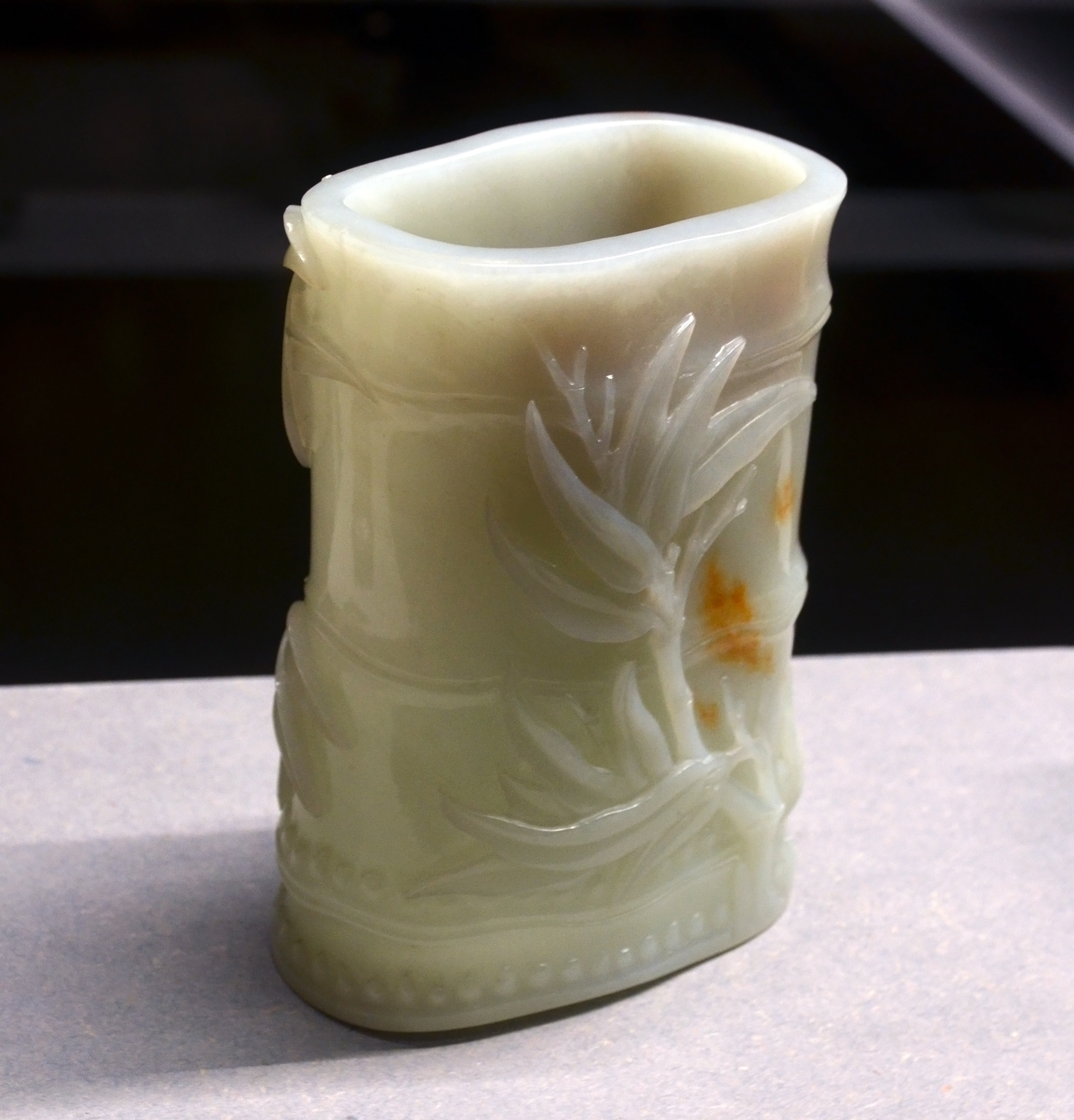
Brushholder in jade, Qing Dynasty

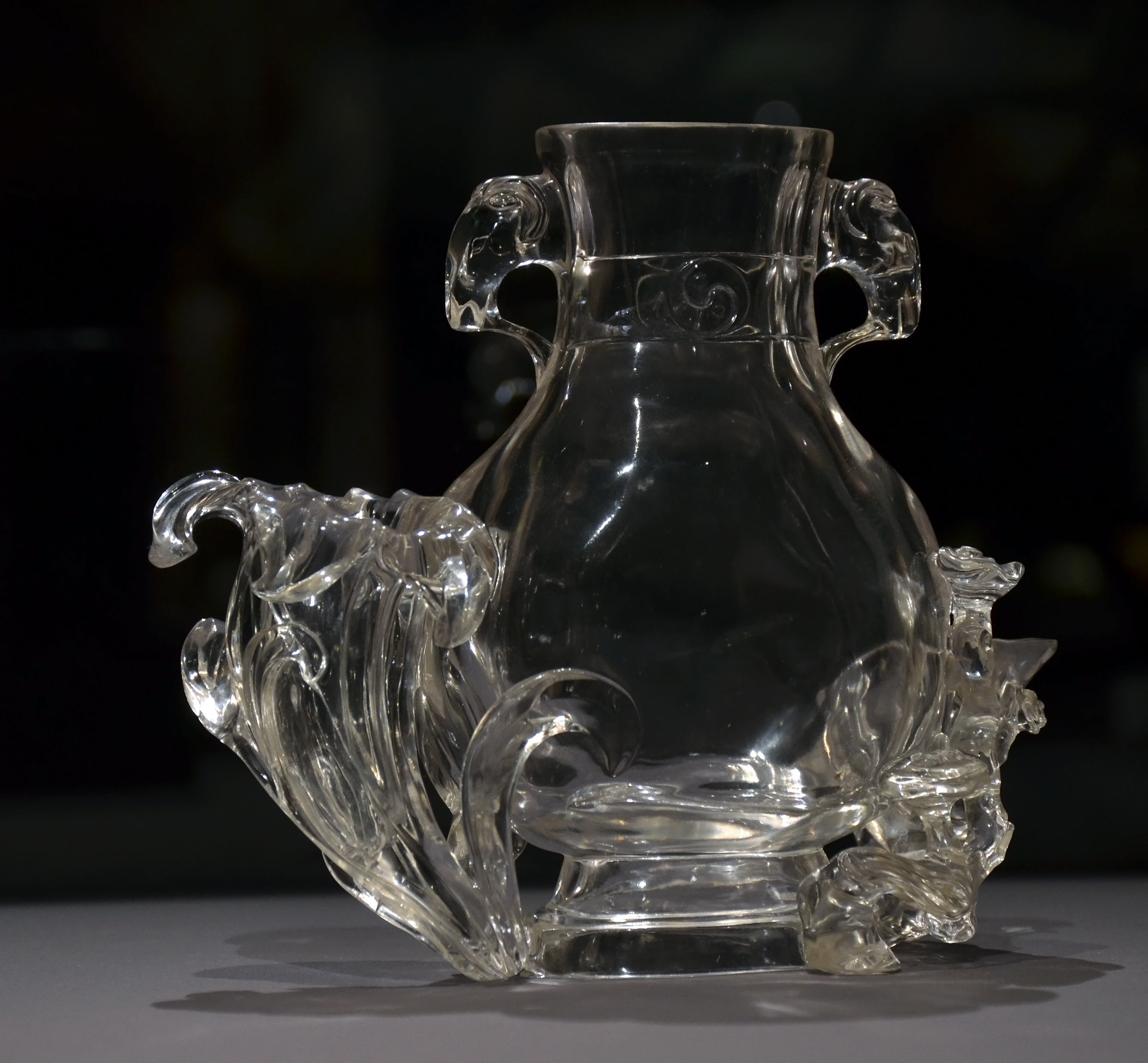
Vase in rock crystal, Qianlong era

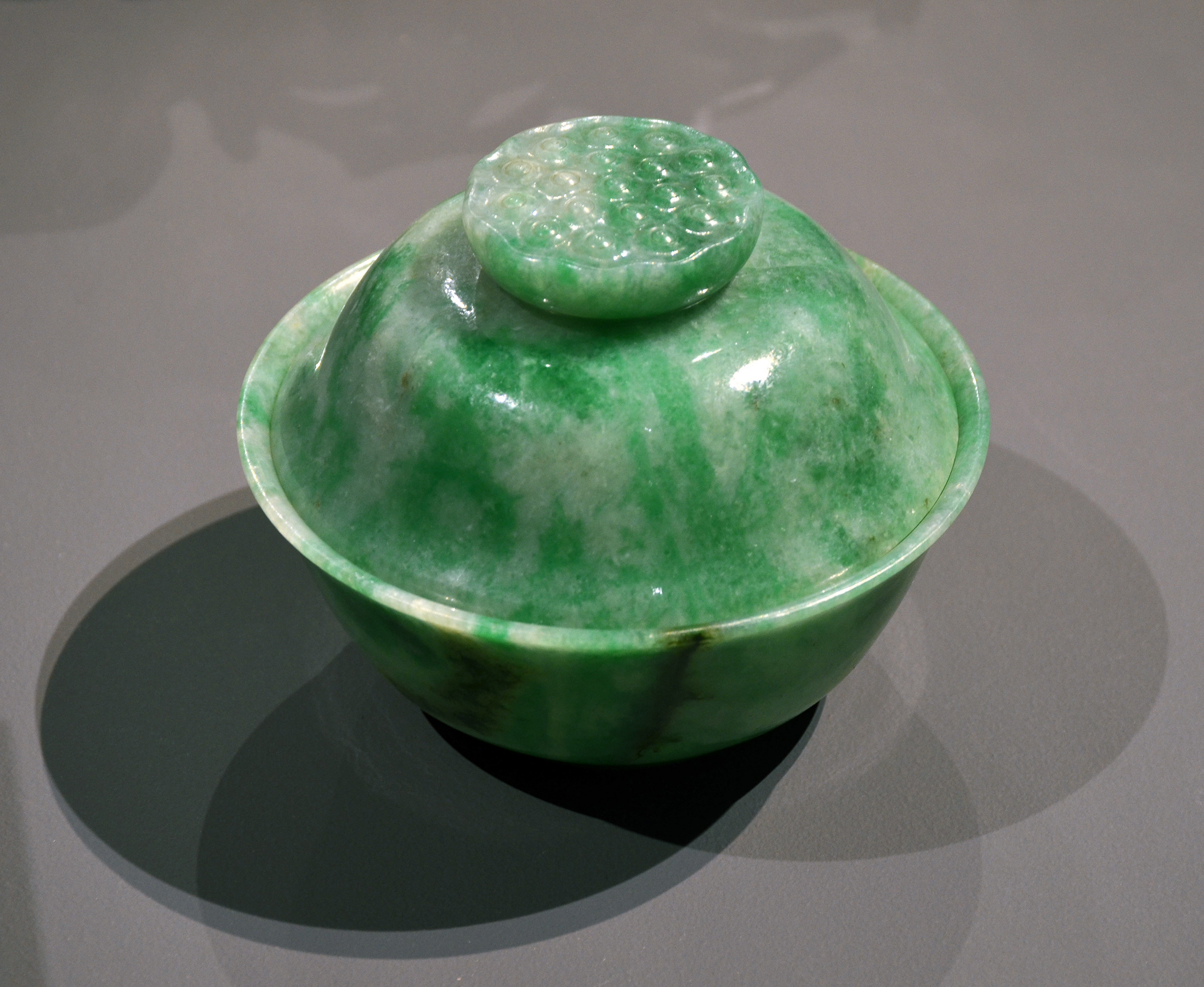
Covered bowl in jadeite, Qing Dynasty

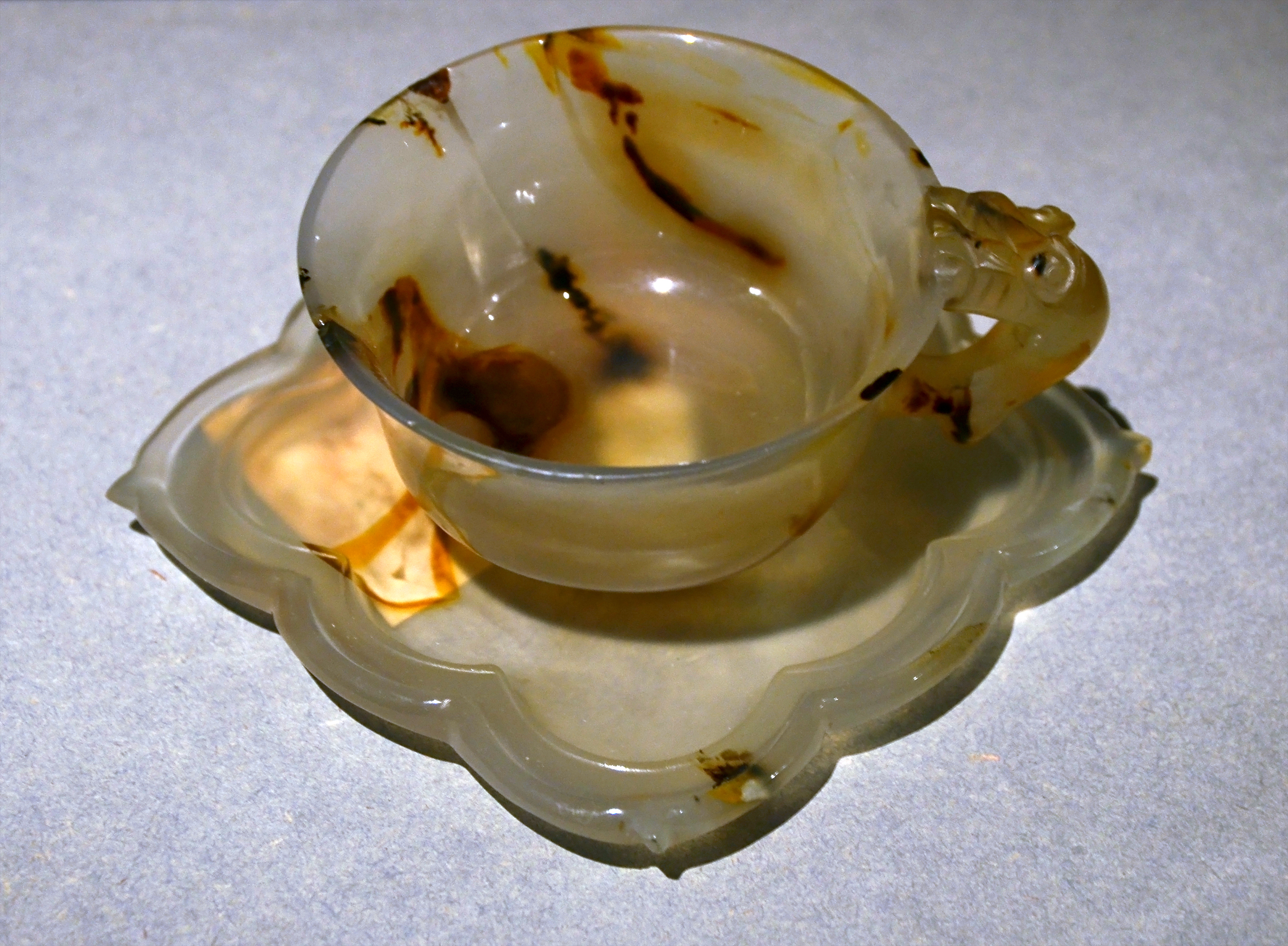
Cup and cupholder in agate, Yongzheng era

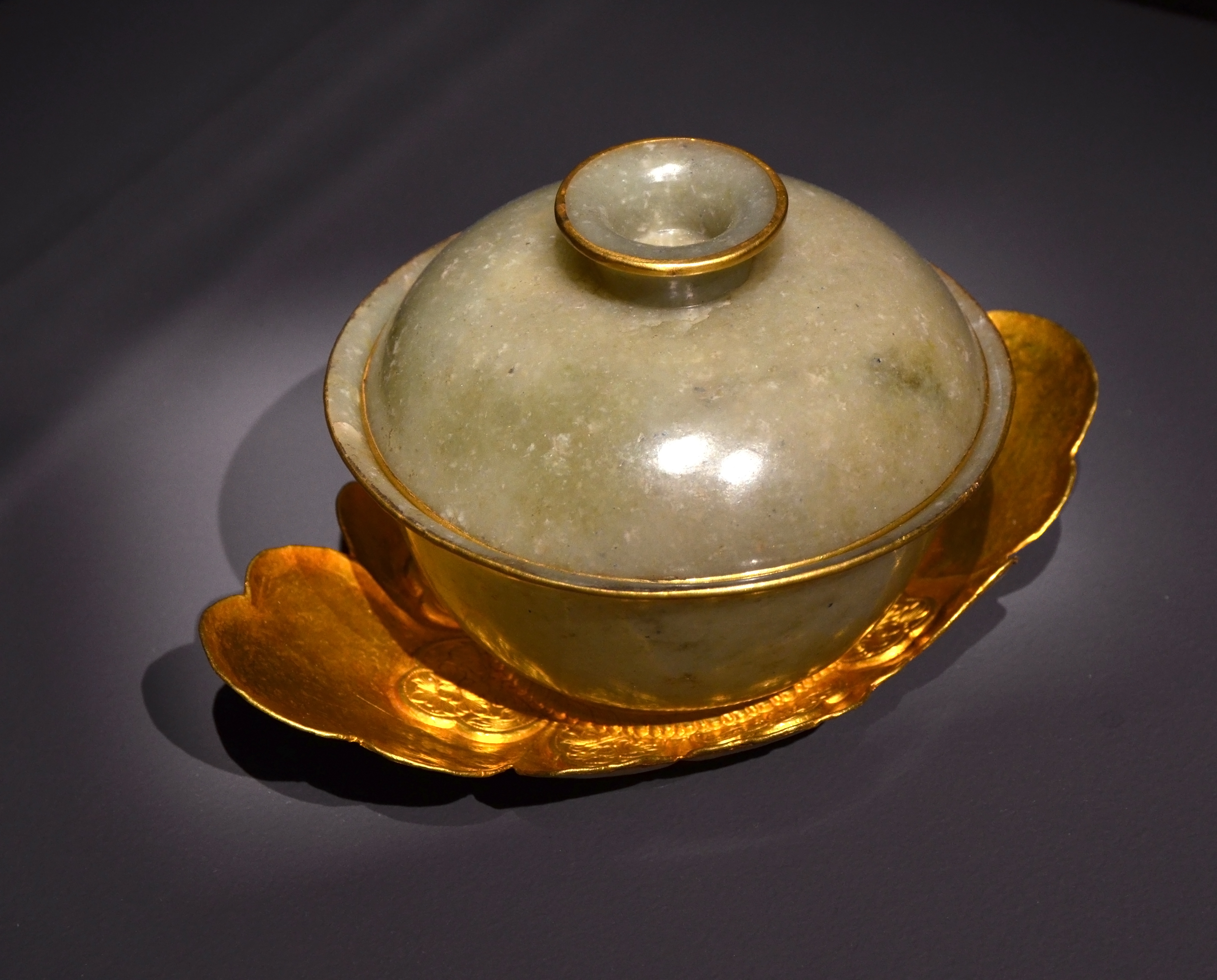
Qing Dynasty jade cup on a gold stand, one of the Siamese embassy's gifts

== See also ==
- Historical Museum of French-Chinese Friendship
- Musée mexicain
