= Museum of Chinese in America =

Museum in New York City

Coordinates: 40°42′58″N 73°59′58″W

Museum of Chinese in America 美國華人博物館
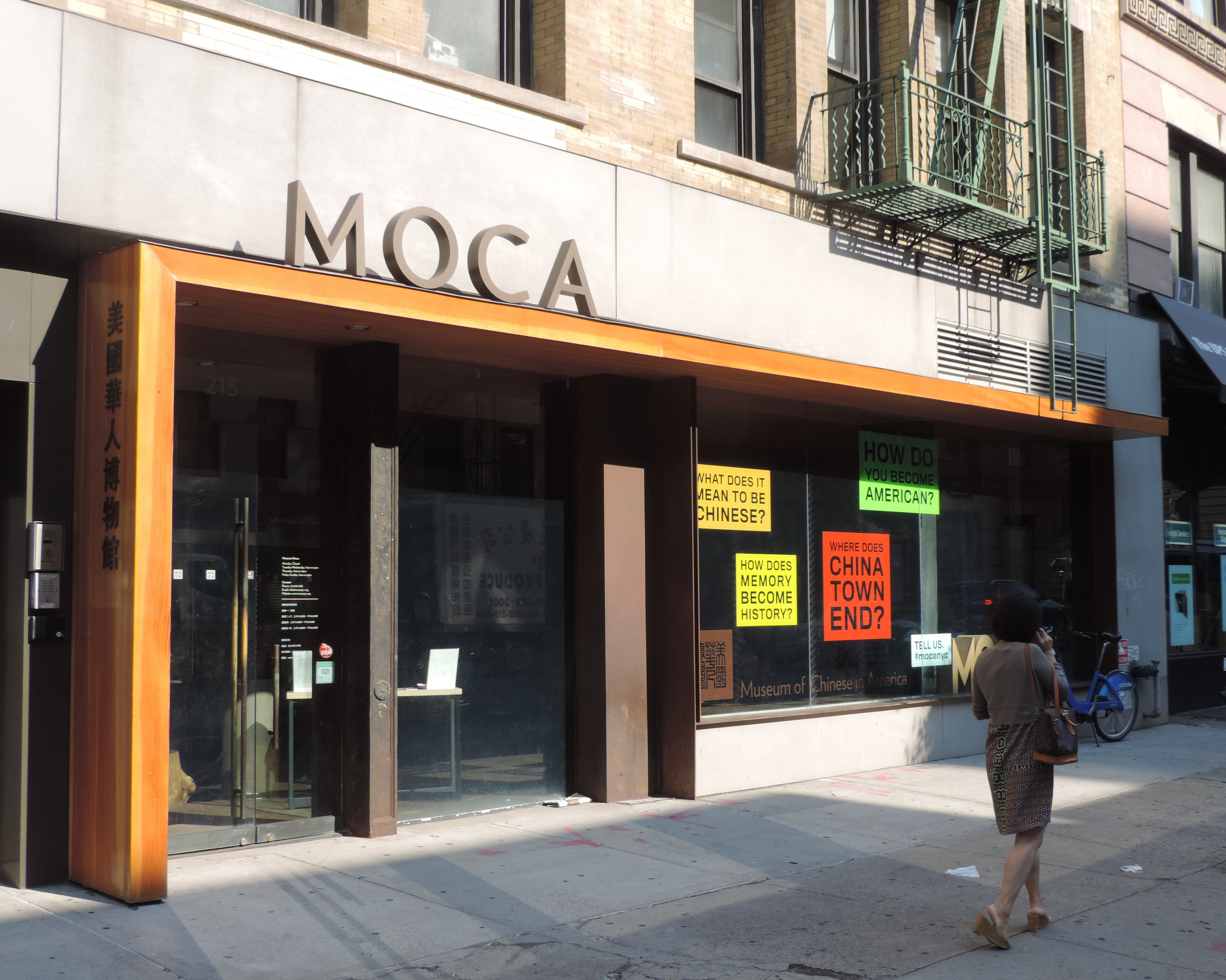
- The museum in 2015
- Established: 1980
- Location: 215 Centre Street; New York, NY 10013; USA
- Type: Art, Cultural, History museum
- Director: Michael Lee
- Curator: Herb Tam
- Public transit access: Subway: Canal Street, 2 blocks away ( trains)
- Website: www.mocanyc.org

The Museum of Chinese in America (traditional Chinese: 美國華人博物館; simplified Chinese: 美国华人博物馆; pinyin: Měiguó Huárén Bówùguǎn; Jyutping: Mei5gwok3 Waa4jan4 Bok3mat6gun2; abbreviated MOCA) is a museum in Chinatown, Manhattan, New York City, which exhibits Chinese American history. It is a nonprofit 501(c)(3) education and cultural institution that presents the living history, heritage, culture, and diverse experiences of Chinese Americans through exhibitions, educational services and public programs. Much of its collection was damaged or destroyed in a fire in January 2020. The museum reopened to the public on July 15, 2021. It has been criticized by some Chinatown residents due to concerns related to gentrification.

== History ==
Founded in 1980 in Manhattan's Chinatown, the museum began as the New York Chinatown History Project by historian John Kuo Wei Tchen and community resident and activist Charles Lai to promote understanding of the Chinese American experience and to address the concern that "the memories and experiences of aging older generations would perish without oral history, photo documentation, research and collecting efforts." From 1997 to 2006, Fay Chew Matsuda served as director of the museum.

In 2005, the museum received part of a $20 million grant from the Carnegie Corporation, made possible through a donation by then-New York City mayor Michael Bloomberg.

The museum moved to a new site at 215 Centre Street in 2009. The space was designed by architect Maya Lin and was six times as large as the old site. The permanent exhibition, With a Single Step, was designed by Matter Practice. In May 2011, Herb Tam became curator and director of exhibitions.

In 2019, the museum relaunched their gift store with a new partner, the Asian American retail brand Pearl River Mart. Called MOCA Shop by Pearl River, the store is a "curated collection of items that hold great meaning in Chinese American culture." In the same year, the museum was awarded $35 million from New York City's broader $50 million disbursement toward community projects in Chinatown as part of a deal to allow the expansion of a jail there. The decision has been scrutinized by certain members of the Chinatown community, who have accused the museum of furthering gentrification in the neighborhood. Subsequently, there were consistent protests from Chinatown residents and business owners, as well as several exhibited artists rescinding their artwork.

In January 2020, a fire damaged the building at 70 Mulberry Street, where the museum's collection was held, with about 85,000 items potentially affected by water damage. While it was initially believed that nearly all of them might have been lost, a substantial part was determined to be "very much salvageable" several days after the incident. Around 35,000 items had been digitized and backed up before the fire. Much of the collection was restored by disaster-relief specialists who worked to prevent mold growth and preserve structure. After its closure for over a year, the museum reopened to the public on July 15, 2021.

In 2022, it was announced that the museum would partner yet again with Maya Lin for another renovation "that will cost an estimated $118 million and nearly quintuple the institution's size, to about 68,000 square feet." Originally, the museum was intended to close at the end of 2023 to allow for construction through to a 2025 completion date. However, such construction has been postponed in anticipation of a plan to raise and consolidate the necessary capital.

In February 2024, the museum was able to purchase its main building at 215 Centre Street for $51.1 million. In March, the museum's board chose Michael Lee to serve as a new director, replacing Nancy Yao. Later, in September, the museum announced its first-ever performing artist residency program that would run from October through February 2025.

== Exhibitions ==
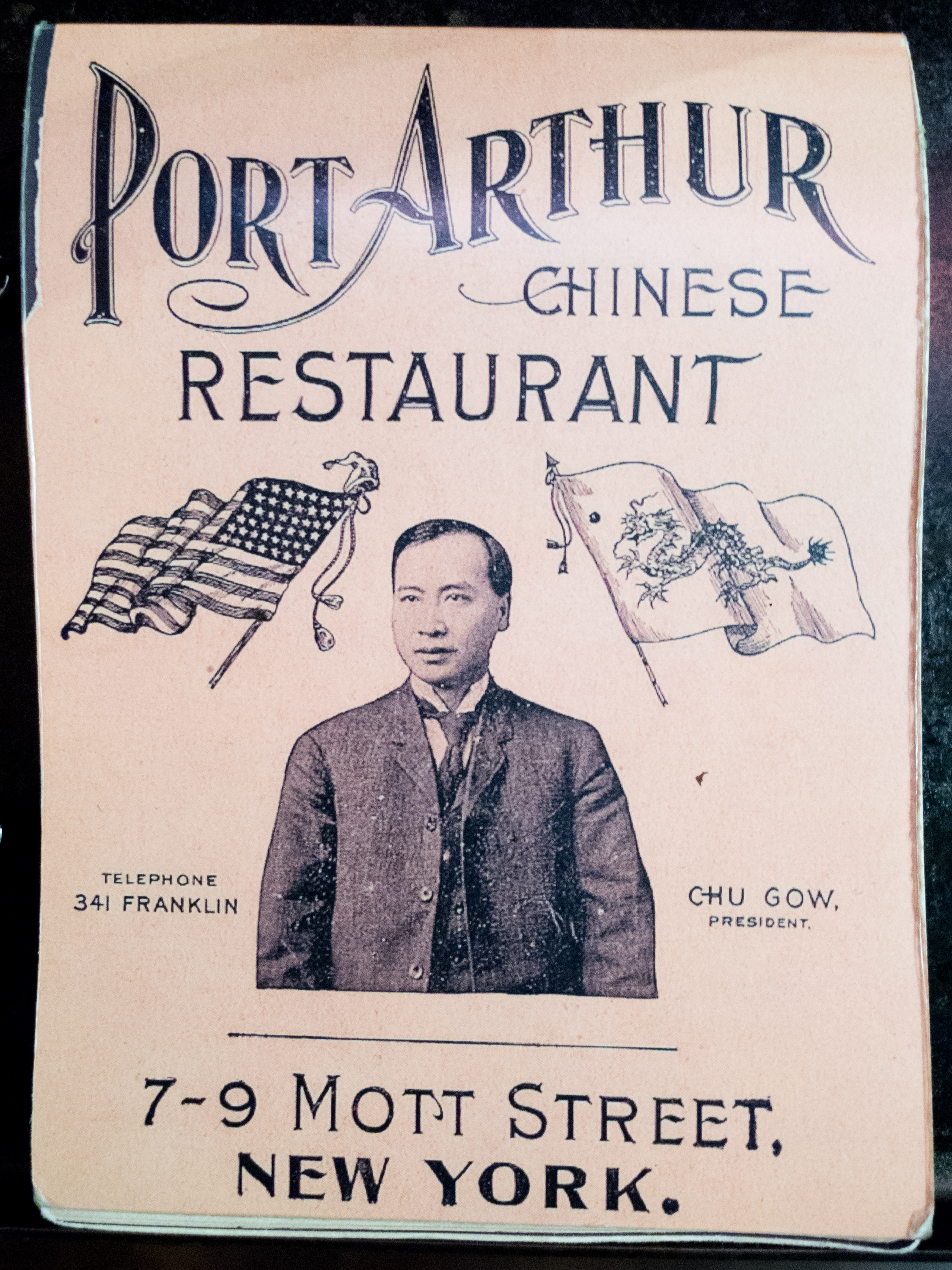
Menu of Port Arthur Chinese Restaurant, one of the oldest Chinese restaurants in Chinatown, on display

The core exhibition With a Single Step: Stories in the Making of America discusses over 160 years of Chinese American history and is augmented annually with two to four rotating exhibitions on thematic, historic, and artistic subjects.

The museum in January 2015 presented Waves of Identity: 35 Years of Archiving. The title of the exhibit was inspired by a Chinese proverb, "Each wave of the Yangtze River pushes at the wave ahead."

=== Current ===
- With a Single Step: Stories in the Making of America (September 1, 2009 – December 31, 2028)
- Magazine Fever: Gen X Asian American Periodicals (October 3, 2024 – March 30, 2025)

=== Former ===
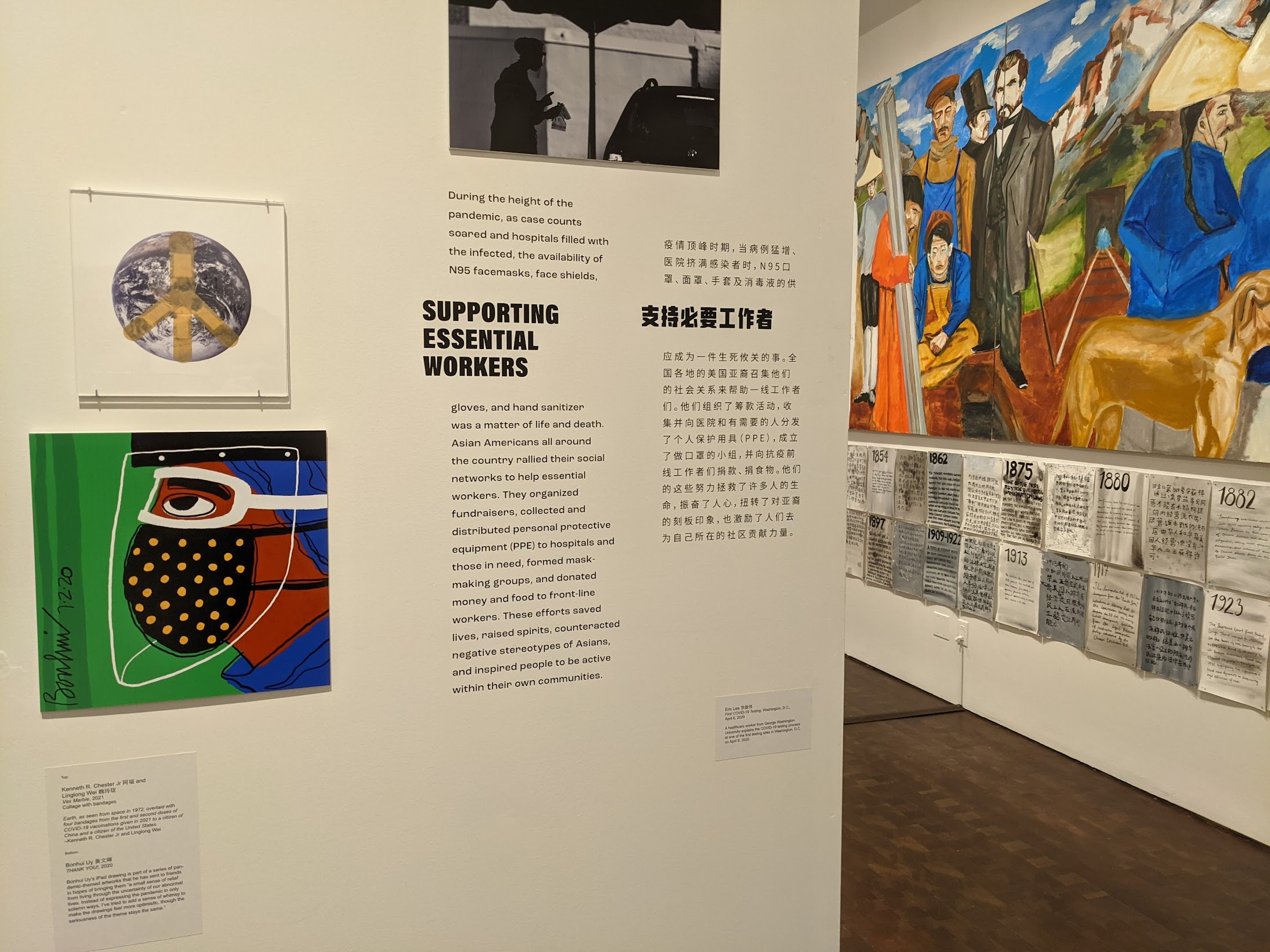
Artwork within the 2021 – 2023 "Responses: Asian American Voices Resisting the Tides of Racism" exhibition.

- Five Senses Of Chinatown (December 6, 2023 – September 8, 2024)
- Sour, Sweet, Bitter, Spicy: Stories of Chinese Food and Identity in America (March 17, 2023 – November 12, 2023)
- Responses: Asian American Voices Resisting the Tides of Racism (July 15, 2021 – October 29, 2023)
- an unlikely photojournalist: Emile Bocian in Chinatown (December 14, 2020 – December 31, 2021)
- Gathering: Collecting and Documenting Chinese American History (October 17, 2019 – March 22, 2020)
- The Chinese Helped Build the Railroad – The Railroad Helped Build America (October 17, 2019 – March 22, 2020)
- Interior Lives: Photographs of Chinese Americans in the 1980s by Bud Glick (October 18, 2018 – March 24, 2019)
- FOLD: Golden Venture Paper Sculptures (October 5, 2017 - March 25, 2018)
- Sour, Sweet, Bitter, Spicy: Stories of Chinese Food and Identity in America (October 6, 2016 – September 10, 2017)
- Stage Design by Ming Cho Lee (April 28, 2016 – September 11, 2016)
- Chinese Style: Rediscovering the Architecture of Poy Gum Lee, 1923–1968 (September 24, 2015 – March 27, 2016)
- SUB URBANISMS: Casino Urbanization, Chinatowns, and the Contested American Landscape (September 24, 2015 – March 27, 2016)
- Yu Lik Wai: It's a Bright Guilty World (October 8, 2015 – August 11, 2016)
- Water to Paper, Paint to Sky: The Art of Tyrus Wong (March 26, 2015 – September 13, 2015)
- Memory Prints: The Story World of Phillip Chen (September 25, 2014 – January 3, 2015)
- Waves of Identity: 35 Years of Archiving (September 25, 2014 – January 3, 2015)
- Oil and Water: Reinterpreting Ink (April 24, 2014 – September 14, 2014)
- The Lee Family of New York Chinatown Since 1888 (October 23, 2013 – June 6, 2014)
- A Floating Population (December 13, 2013 – April 13, 2014)
- Portraits of New York Chinatown (December 13, 2013 – April 13, 2014)
- Front Row: Chinese American Designers (April 26, 2013 – December 1, 2013)
- Shanghai Glamour: New Women 1910s–40s (April 26, 2013 – November 3, 2013)
- Marvels and Monsters: Unmasking Asian Images in U.S. Comics, 1942–1986 and Alt. Comics: Asian American Artists Reinvent the Comic (September 27, 2012 – February 24, 2013)
- America through a Chinese Lens (April 26, 2012 – September 9, 2012)
- Lee Mingwei: The Travelers and The Quartet Project (October 20, 2011 – March 26, 2012)
- Unearthing (May 5, 2011 – September 19, 2011)
- Chinese Puzzles (November 6, 2010 – April 9, 2011)
- Chinatown POV: Reflections on September 11 (September 11, 2010 – November 29, 2010)
- Both Here and There: Yale-China and a Century of Transformative Encounters (September 2, 2010 – October 11, 2010)
- Here & Now: Chapter III Towards Transculturalism (February 11, 2010 – March 28, 2010)
- Here & Now: Chapter II Crossing Boundaries (November 19, 2009 – January 4, 2010)
- Here & Now: Chinese Artists in New York Chapter 1 (September 22, 2009 – November 2, 2009)

== Collections ==
As of early 2020, MOCA's Collections and Research Center contained more than 85,000 artifacts, photos, memorabilia, documents, oral histories, and art work. The collection covers a timespan of 160 years and includes e.g. historical Chinese restaurant menus, boat tickets, family photographs, and wedding dresses.

=== Research Center ===
The museum's previous gallery space on 70 Mulberry Street is used as an archival center and serves as a research center. The Research Center contains applications, such as Web-based versions of gallery exhibitions and an interactive timeline of Chinese American history. The center also provides resources on topics such as immigration and diversity. The Research Center was damaged by fire in 2020.

=== Special collections ===
Special collections include:

| Name of Collection | About Collection |
|---|---|
| Recovering Chinatown: The 9/11 Collection | Recovering Chinatown: The 9/11 Collection includes images, videos, oral history, brochures, posters, reports, books, scrapbooks, T-shirts, and other artworks that the museum began collecting shortly after September 11 attacks, which occurred near Chinatown. |
| Fly to Freedom Collection | MOCA's Fly to Freedom Collection includes 173 paper sculptures created by passengers of the ship Golden Venture, which ran aground on June 6, 1993. Many of the nearly 300 passengers, most of whom were illegal immigrants from China, were held in detention by the United States Immigration and Naturalization Service, some for up to four years. Detainees created sculptures first as gifts to pro-bono lawyers who took up their cases, and later, to pass time during their days spent incarcerated. |
| Oral History Collection | MOCA conducted approximately 350 interviews that make up its 7 oral history collections. The conducted between 1980 and 2013, documenting memories and narratives related to the Chinese American experience. |
| Marcella Dear Collection | Donated in 2006 by a longtime museum supporter and area resident, the Marcella Chin Dear collection includes dozens of textiles, hundreds of imported books, numerous boxes of old records, posters, game sets, instruments, family photographs and letters, store signs, ceramics, pieces of furniture, and tools from the family's home and businesses. The Chin family had remained in Manhattan's Chinatown for five generations. |
| Qipao/Cheongsam Collection | MOCA's first qipao/cheongsam collection, donated by Pamela Chen, includes 77 Chinese dresses that were custom-tailored in the 1930s and 1940s and once owned by her mother, Phoebe Shou-Heng Chen (1917–1993). MOCA's second qipao/cheongsam collection, donated by Angela King and her sister Fern Tse, includes 367 family dresses. Angela King's mother was a fashion designer and was involved in the designs of her dresses, usually ordering specific requirements from China. MOCA donated 262 pieces from this collection to the New York Chinese Cultural Center in 2012. |
| Hazel Ying Lee Collection | Comprising primary artifacts including original personal photographs, family letters, documents, newspaper articles, and memorabilia, the collection describes Hazel Ying Lee's experience as a Chinese American woman aviator during the 1930s and 1940s. It was donated by Hazel's sister, Frances M. Tong, as well as filmmaker Alan H. Rosenberg. |
| CMTA Collection | The Chinese Musical and Theatrical Association (CMTA) collection is composed of approximately 26 intricate opera costumes, 24 rare musical instruments, 20 pairs of shoes, 20 hats, 41 fabric samples, 6 shawls, 21 stage props, and numerous related documents. These items depict the Cantonese opera clubs in North America's Chinatowns from the 1930s to the present. These items also reveal how Chinese immigrants adapted opera to modern settings, as well as how opera clubs became culturally important to immigrants. |

== Legacy Awards Gala ==
At MOCA's 2015 Legacy Awards Gala, the museum honored several people and organizations for their roles in Chinese-American culture. Honorees were the C.V. Starr Scholars, Hong Kong-born American actor Nancy Kwan, and Kohn Pedersen Fox Associates founding design partner William C. Louie.

2023 honorees included:

- Sewell Chan
- Ho Kew Lee
- Frank H. Wu
- Sylvia Fung Chin

2022 honorees included:

- Chinese American Veterans of World War II
- Dr. David Lam
- The Honorable Gary Locke
- Joyous String Ensemble

2014 honorees included:

- Tyrus Wong
- Theodore T. Wang,
- Victor and William Fung Foundation Ltd.

2013 honorees included:

- Michael Bloomberg
- Pei-Yuan Chia
- Ming Tsai
- Wang Yannan

2012 honorees included:

- Angelica Cheung
- Silas Chou
- Calvin Tsao
- Humberto Leon and Carol Lim

2011 honorees included:

- Oscar L. Tang
- David Liu
- Dominic Ng
- Pichet Ong

2010 honorees included:

- The Chao Family
- Maurice R. Greenberg & The Starr Foundation
- HSBC Bank USA
- Anita Lo
- Bill and Judith Davidson Moyers
- Ben Wang
- Major General John L. Fugh *(posthumous award)

2009 honorees included:

- Ronnie C. Chan
- Charles B. Wang Community Health Center
- Anla Cheng
- Mark E. Kingdon
- Lucy Liu
- Wan-go Weng
- Jerry Yang

Previous awardees:

- William Y. Chang (2000)

== See also ==
- Chinese Americans in New York City
- Chinese American Museum (based in Los Angeles)
- Chinese Historical Society of America (based in San Francisco)
- Chinese Historical Society of Southern California
- Chinese Culture Center (based in San Francisco)
- Chinese American Museum Washington, DC
- Weaverville Joss House State Historic Park
- List of museums and cultural institutions in New York City
