= Chinese American Museum of Chicago =

Coordinates: 41°51′4.06″N 87°38′0.67″W

- Chinatown Museum Foundation
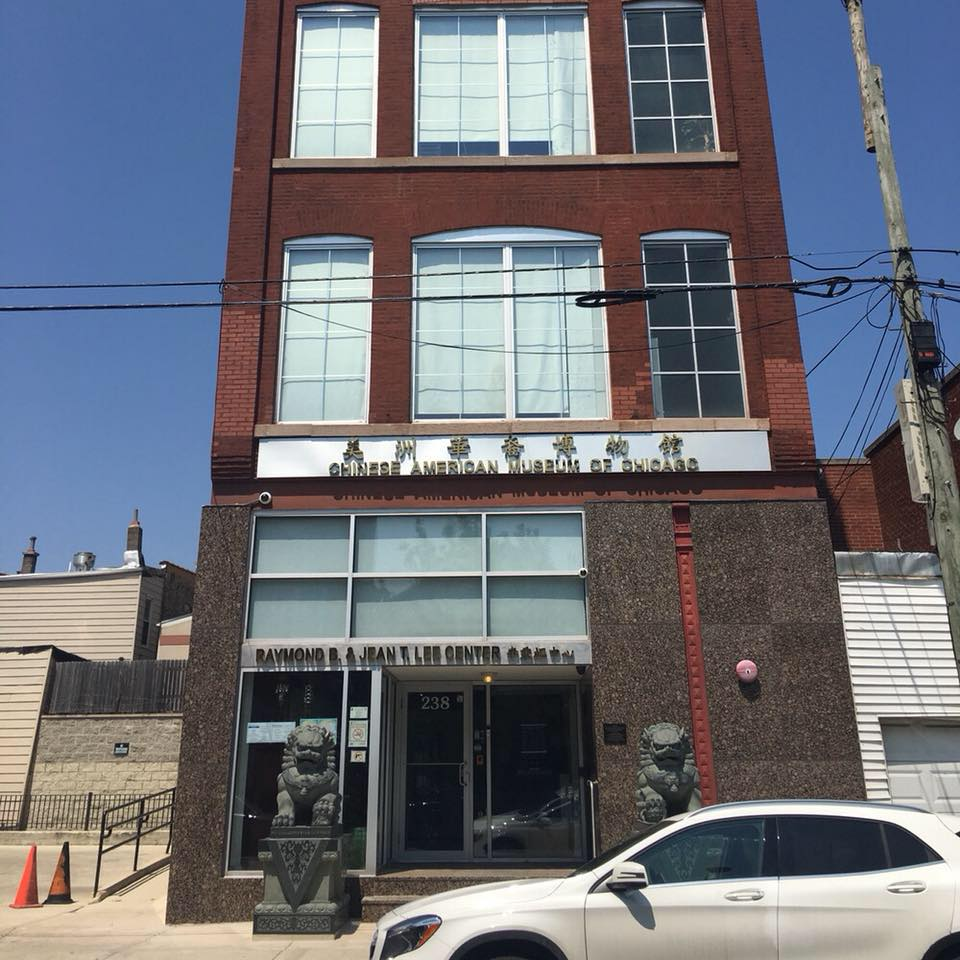
- Established: 2005
- Location: Raymond B. & Jean T. Lee Center 238 West 23rd Street; Chicago, Illinois 60616; P: (312) 949-1000
- Director: Caroline Ng
- President: Judy SooHoo
- Owners: Chinatown Museum Foundation founded in 2002 by Dr. Chuimei Ho, Dr. Kim K Tee, Sam Ma, John S Tan, Dr. Tao Luo & Wai Chee Yuen.
- Website: Official website

Chinese American Museum of Chicago
- Traditional Chinese: 美洲華裔博物館
- Simplified Chinese: 美洲华裔博物馆
Transcriptions
Standard Mandarin
- Hanyu Pinyin: Měizhōu Huáyì Bówùguǎn

The Chinese American Museum of Chicago (CAMOC) seeks to advance the appreciation of Chinese American culture through exhibitions, education, and research and to preserve the past, present, and future of Chinese Americans primarily in the American Midwest. The museum opened in 2005 in Chicago's Chinatown neighborhood. Although it suffered a damaging fire in 2008, it reopened its renovated quarters, the Raymond B. & Jean T. Lee Center, in 2010. CAMOC is governed by the Board of Directors of the Chinatown Museum Foundation (CMF), a 501(C)(3) non-profit corporation located in Chicago, Illinois.

== History ==
The museum building was built in 1896 as a warehouse, and was later home to the Quong Yick Co. After a devastating fire in September 2008, the museum was closed. Raymond B. Lee, whose family ran a food wholesale business in the museum building, donated $660,000 to buy the building to start the museum. Lee, who as a teen slept on the third floor, has donated another $250,000 for renovations since the fire. It reopened its renovated quarters, the Raymond B. & Jean T. Lee Center, in 2010.

== Current Exhibits ==
- The permanent exhibit, "Great Wall to Great Lakes: Chinese Immigration to the Midwest " on the second floor tells the stories of immigrant journeys to the Chicago area and beyond; when, how and why the Chinese who came to America made their way across the country to settle in the Midwest.
- Another permanent exhibit, "My Chinatown: Stories from Within", a 16-minute video on the second floor, about the stories of the people of Chinatown- their journeys, their customs, their work, their families- from within Chinatown borders. The video was a collaboration between Chinese American Museum of Chicago and the Chicago History Museum.

== Past Exhibits ==
- The temporary exhibit "The Way We Wore: Celebrating Chinese Fashion Heritage" displayed Chinese fashion heritage with donations and loans from the Chinese community. Many of the objects in the museum came from donations or loans from community members and people in the surrounding areas, and that shows in what is displayed, from family photos to personal jewelry sets. The exhibition closed February 10, 2019 to make way for the Railroad exhibition.
- Another temporary exhibit, "The Chinese Helped Build the Railroad–The Railroad Helped Build America"] focused on the important role Chinese immigrants had when constructing America's first Transcontinental Railway in the 1800s. The bilingual exhibit, which features photographs by Li Ju, pays tribute the approximately 12,000 Chinese workers who completed the railway and also includes recreations of their day-to-day life. The project was organized through contributions by the Chinese Railroad Workers in North America Project at Stanford University, Li Ju, and the Chinese Historical Society of America. The exhibition opened on March 2, 2019.

== Events ==
=== Chinese New Year Celebration ===
Each year a Chinese New Year Celebration is held at the museum, featuring live Chinese traditional music, lion dancing, Chinese chess, calligraphy design and food. The 2021 Chinese New Year Celebration went virtual due to the COVID-19 pandemic.

== See also ==
- History of Chinese Americans in Chicago
- Weaverville Joss House State Historic Park
- Chinese American Museum
- Museum of Chinese in America
- Chinese Historical Society of Southern California
- Chinese Culture Center
