= Lisa Sasaki =

U.S. museum director and curator (born 1975)

- Born: 1975 (age 50–51); Denver, Colorado
- Education: University of Denver
- Occupation: Museum director

Lisa Sasaki (born 1975) is an American museum director and curator. She is the director of the Smithsonian Asian Pacific American Center. Prior to being appointed in November 2016, Sasaki was director of the Audience and Civic Engagement Center at the Oakland Museum of California and director of program development at the Japanese American National Museum. From 2001 to 2003, she was a museum curator at the Southeastern Colorado Heritage Center in Pueblo, Colorado, and assistant collections manager at the Denver Museum of Nature and Science.

== Early life and education ==
Sasaki was born in Denver, Colorado in approximately 1975. She earned her bachelor's degree in history and archaeology from Cornell University. Sasaki earned her master's degree in anthropology from the University of Denver.

== Career ==
Sasaki started as an assistant manager at the Denver Museum of Nature and Science, then worked as a museum curator at the Southeastern Colorado Heritage Center from 2001 to 2003. From 2003 to 2012, she worked as the director of program development at the Japanese American National Museum (JANM) in Los Angeles. Sasaki indicated that her experience in JANM "makes her appreciate the importance of a physical museum".

From 2012 to November 2016, Sasaki worked as the director at the Oakland Museum of California's Audience and Civic Engagement Center. She was in charge of the museum's marketing and audience development initiative that led to the doubling of the museum visitation. She also explored the importance of audience engagement and the community needs that museums provide, through projects such as the Neighborhood Identity Report, Pacific Worlds Task Force, and Altered State Prototyping.

On November 14, 2016, Sasaki was appointed director of the Smithsonian Asian Pacific American Center. Sasaki told NBC News that she felt, "it's a bit like winning the Super Bowl and getting an Academy Award. To watch the work of [previous directors] Franklin Odo and Konrad Ng, and to be part of that legacy, is awe inspiring to me."

In addition to being a guest lecturer for graduate museum studies at John F. Kennedy University, she also currently serves as both the board president of the Western Museums Association and the advisory council for the Council of Jewish American Museums.
