= Holehole bushi =

Minyo music in Hawaii

Holehole bushi is a type of folk song sung by Japanese immigrants as they worked on Hawaii's sugar plantations during the late 19th and early 20th century.

Hole Hole is the Hawaiian word for sugar cane leaves, while Bushi (節) is a Japanese word for song. These songs were sung as the workers stripped dead leaves from sugar cane so that it could be processed more efficiently. Many of the workers who stripped cane were women. The songs were often about plantation life, how difficult the work was, relationships between men and women, and reminiscences of their hometowns. The melodies were based on folk songs from their home prefectures, mainly Yamaguchi, Hiroshima, and Kumamoto, among others.

As Japanese immigrants began moving away from the sugar plantations in the 1890s, the Holehole bushi began being sung in teahouses.

These songs were preserved by music teacher Harry Urata, who taught the songs to many of his students.

== See also ==
- Japanese in Hawaii
- Work song
