= Charles B. Wang Community Health Center =

Health clinic in New York City

- Federally Qualified Health Center

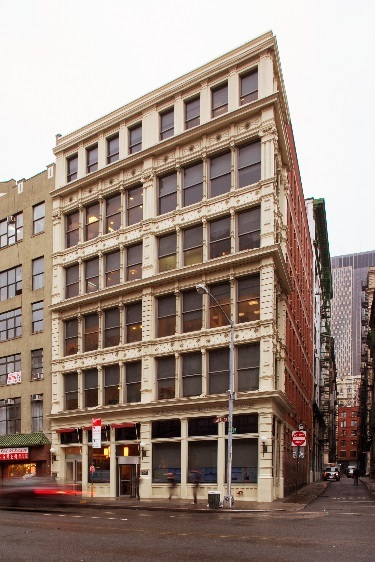
- Location on Canal Street

Geography
- Location: 268 Canal St, New York, NY 10013; 125 Walker St, New York, NY 10013; 168 Centre St, New York, NY 10013; 136-26 37th Ave, Flushing, NY 11354; 137-43 45th Ave, Flushing, NY 11355; 131-72 40th Road Flushing, NY 11354

Links
- Website: http://www.cbwchc.org

The Charles B. Wang Community Health Center (CBWCHC), founded in 1971, is a nonprofit organization and Federally Qualified Health Center in New York City. The Health Center provides primary health care to members of the community with a focus on Asian Americans. There are six locations in Lower Manhattan and Flushing, Queens. In 2023, the Health Center served more than 59,000 patients and 285,000 service visits. The Health Center's staff are fluent in Mandarin, Cantonese, Taishanese, Shanghainese, Hokkien, Vietnamese, and Korean. The Health Center serves all patients regardless of language, immigration history, insurance status, or ability to pay.

== History ==
CBWCHC was started in 1971 by a group of volunteers who organized the Chinatown Health Fair in New York City. About 2,500 community members participated in the fair. The volunteers organized a free clinic in a space donated by the Church of Our Savior on Henry Street and the Chinatown Health Clinic opened that same year. As the free clinic grew, donations funded the expansion to a new location at 89 Baxter Street in 1979. It was renamed the Charles B. Wang Community Health Center in 1999.

As part of the Lyndon Johnson Administration's War on Poverty, neighborhood health centers were created to provide health and social services in poor and underserved communities. Through the 1970s, Congress authorized funding for community, migrant, and public housing health centers. In 1989, Congress passed the Omnibus Budget Reconciliation Act which consolidated these funding streams and created the Federally Qualified Health Centers (FQHC) program. This allowed qualified health centers to fully cover the cost of treating uninsured patients. With this Public Health Service Act, the Health Center was more capable of providing care to a larger scope of the community.

== Services ==
Internal Medicine	Primary care for patients 18 and over, check-ups, immunizations, nutrition counseling, screening and treatment for cholesterol, diabetes, high blood pressure, sexually transmitted infections, smoking, cancer, hepatitis B care program, specialty care in optometry, urology, hematology, pulmonology, nephrology
Pediatric Care	Primary care for patients 21 and under, check-ups, immunizations, nutrition counseling, and specialty care.
Obstetrics and Gynecology	GYN, breast/cervical/colorectal cancer screening, HPV testing and vaccinations, HIV/STD testing, pregnancy testing, prenatal and postpartum care, delivery at partner hospitals, breastfeeding education
Dental Care	Teeth cleaning, dental x-rays, dental fillings/crowns, tooth extraction, root canals, periodontal treatment, denture and bridge care
Mental Health	Diagnostic and treatment assessment for disorders, medication management, individual and group therapies, urgent assessment, intervention management of behavioral aspect of medical diseases, screening for depression
Social Services	Family counseling, crisis intervention, case management, assistance with government benefits
Health Education	Chinese/English language health education materials, public group workshops, counseling on health
Additional Services	Women, Infants, and Children (WIC) program, health insurance enrollment, optometry services, nutrition counseling, language access line, Patient Portal

== Funding ==
In May 2025, the center received a donation of $2.97 million from Walter and Shirley Wang to fund improvements such as a new eye care suite and renovations to the pediatric suite.
