= Chinese American Museum DC =

Chinese American Museum Washington, DC
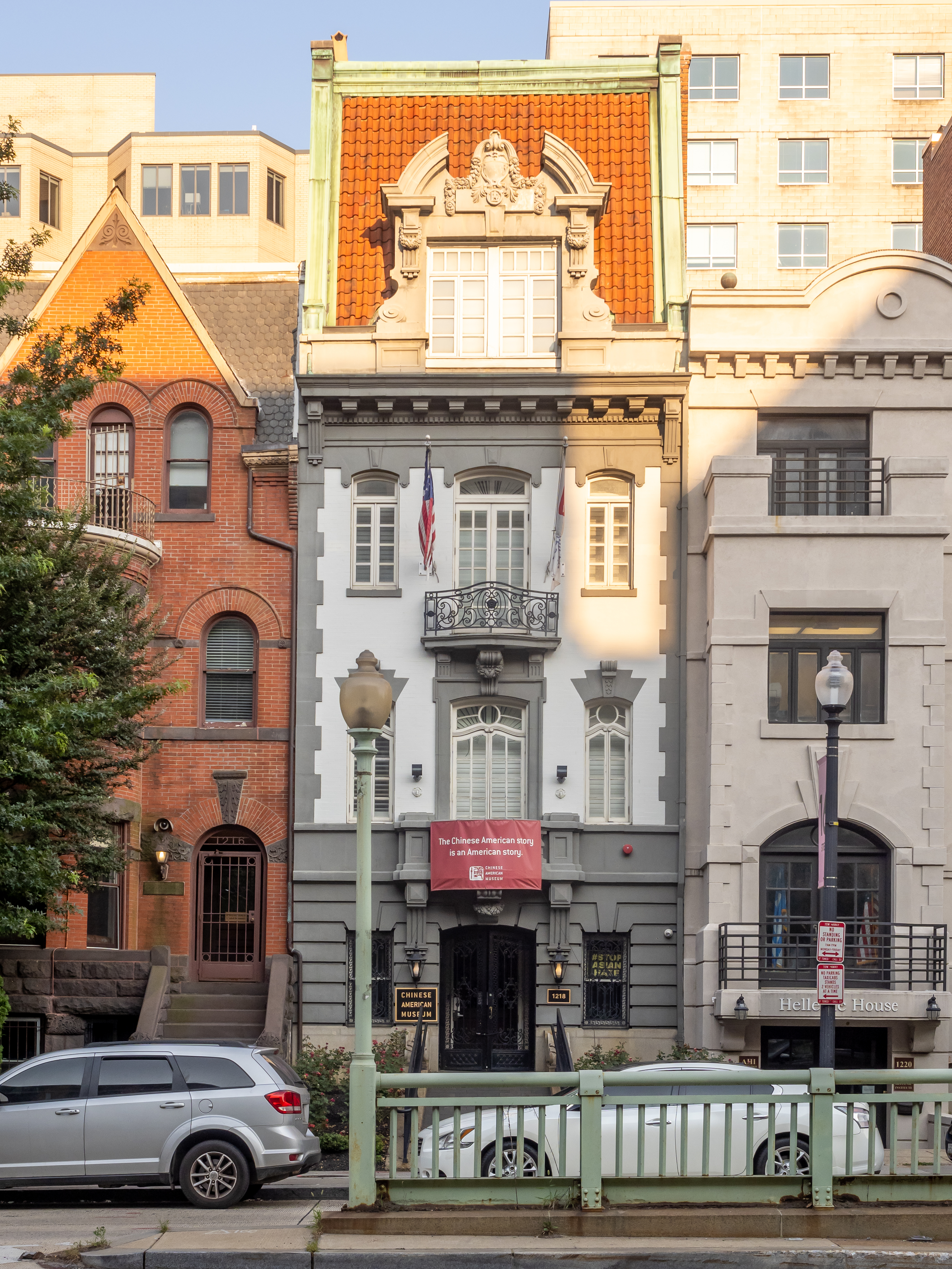
- (2024)
- Established: 2017
- Location: 1218 16th St., NW; Washington, D.C.
- Coordinates: 38.90631°N 77.03684°W
- Type: Cultural museum
- Executive director: Vacant
- Public transit access: Red, Orange, and Blue Metro Lines
- Website: Chinese American Museum DC official site

The Chinese American Museum DC (abbreviated CAMDC) is a cultural museum in Downtown Washington, DC, established through the efforts of The Chinese American Museum Foundation, private benefactors, and the general public. The museum focuses on the history of Chinese in America with an emphasis on the Chinese Exclusion Act of 1882, racial and social issues, cultural topics, and the achievements of past and contemporary Chinese Americans. The project began in late 2017, first with the bequest of a 1907 historic, 5-story building in the Embassy Row section of D.C., four blocks north of the White House. The museum had been open to visitors during its development and has recently reopened to the public after pandemic restrictions.

== Programs and exhibits ==
In October 2019, the museum completed the first phase of permanent exhibits for its reception lobby and first floor, including a digital photo-wall featuring personal stories and images of "everyday" Chinese Americans, as well as an interactive digital timeline highlighting historical dates, figures, and pivotal moments in Chinese American history. The museum also hosted two conferences and corresponding special, temporary exhibits, including "Chinese American Women in History" and "Safe Harbor: Shanghai," a lecture and exhibit on Jewish refugees who sought shelter in World War II Shanghai and later immigrated to the United States.

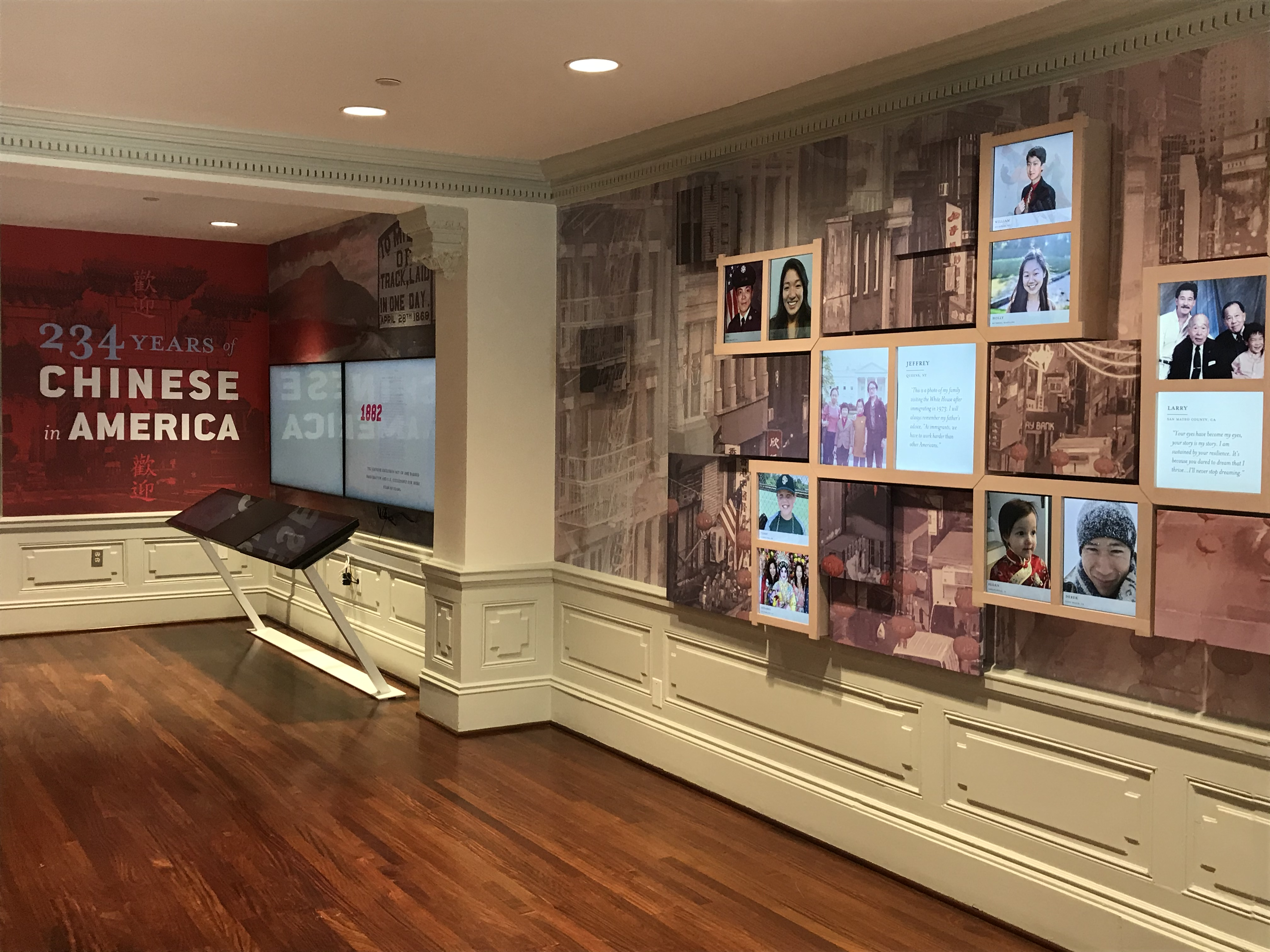
Interactive displays in museum lobby
