= Berry Houses =

Public housing development in Staten Island, New York

- NYCHA property
- Interactive map of Berry Houses
- Coordinates: 40.587°N 74.102°W
- Country: United States
- State: New York
- City: New York City
- Borough: Staten Island
- ZIP codes: 10306
- Area codes: 718, 347, 929, and 917

The Berry Houses are a housing project located in the Dongan Hills neighborhood of Staten Island in New York City. The project consists of eight six-story buildings, containing 506 apartments and housing approximately 1,000 residents. The 13.89-acre development is bordered by Richmond Road, Dongan Hills Avenue, Seaver Avenue, and Jefferson Street. It is owned and managed by New York City Housing Authority (NYCHA) and was built in 1950.

== Development ==
The 1940s saw public housing expand to Staten Island, and the Berry Houses were completed on October 30, 1950. It was designed by Alfred Mosher Butts and named after Brig. Gen. Charles W. Berry (1871–1941), who was both a soldier and a physician.

The Berry Houses are one of three public housing complexes located in Staten Island's 122nd Police Precinct.

== See also ==
- List of New York City Housing Authority properties
