= Mill Brook Houses =

Public Housing in the Bronx, NY

- NYCHA Property
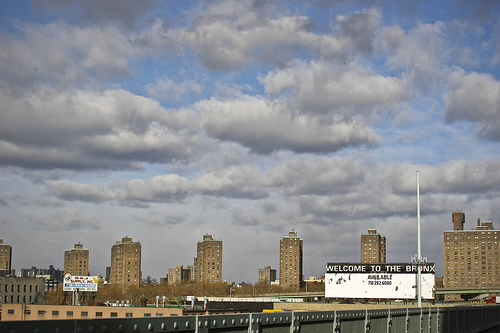
- Interactive map of Mill Brook Houses
- Coordinates: 40.8053°N 73.918°W
- Country: United States
- State: New York
- City: New York City
- Borough: Bronx

Area (Note: Mill Brook and the Extension combined. 10.78 + 0.51)
  - Total: 11.29 acres (4.57 ha)

Population (Note: Mill Brook and the Extension combined. 2531 + 255)
  - Total: 2,786
- Zip Code: 10454

The Mill Brook Houses are a public housing project owned by the New York City Housing Authority (NYCHA) that has 10 buildings (including the Mill Brook Extension Building) that are 16 and 17 stories tall. The housing complex is located between Brook and Cypress Avenues and East 135th and 137th Streets in the Mott Haven section of the Bronx. There are currently 2,786 residents in this complex as of 2025.

== History ==
The first nine buildings were completed in May 1959 while the extension building was completed in January 1962.

=== 21st Century ===
NYCHA planned to construct the Mill Brook Terrace on top of the former parking lot near the Mill Brook Complex itself for the seniors from the NYCHA’s Next Generation Request for Proposals (RFP) process. It was completed in December 2019 with 158 available apartments and studio units for the homeless. It was opened on late 2020 when it was fully-leased to low-income seniors by ribbon cutting with an 1,000-square-foot (93 m^{2}) community room and with over $2M in funding for NYCHA to support the improvements and redevelopments for Mill Brook Houses.

== See also ==
- New York City Housing Authority
