= New York City Housing Authority =

Government agency

Agency overview
- Formed: January 20, 1934
- Jurisdiction: New York City
- Headquarters: 250 Broadway, New York City, New York
- Employees: 13,000
- Agency executives: Lisa Bova-Hiatt, CEO; Jamie Rubin, Chair
- Key document: Public Housing Law
- Website: nyc.gov/nycha

The New York City Housing Authority (NYCHA) is a public development corporation which provides public housing in New York City, and is the largest public housing authority in North America. In 1934, it was created as the first agency of its kind in the United States, it aims to provide decent, affordable housing for low and moderate-income New Yorkers throughout the five boroughs of New York City. NYCHA also administers a citywide Section 8 Leased Housing Program in rental apartments. NYCHA developments include single and double family houses, apartment units, singular floors, and shared small building units, and commonly have large income disparities with their respective surrounding neighborhood or community. These developments, particularly those including large-scale apartment buildings, are often referred to in popular culture as "projects."

The New York City Housing Authority's goal is to increase opportunities for low and moderate-income New Yorkers by providing affordable housing and facilitating access to public service and community services. As of 2023, 360,970 New Yorkers reside in NYCHA's 335 public housing developments across the city's five boroughs, with an inventory of 177,569 units and 2,411 buildings. Another 235,000 receive subsidized rental assistance in private homes through the NYCHA-administered Section 8 Leased Housing Program.

== History ==
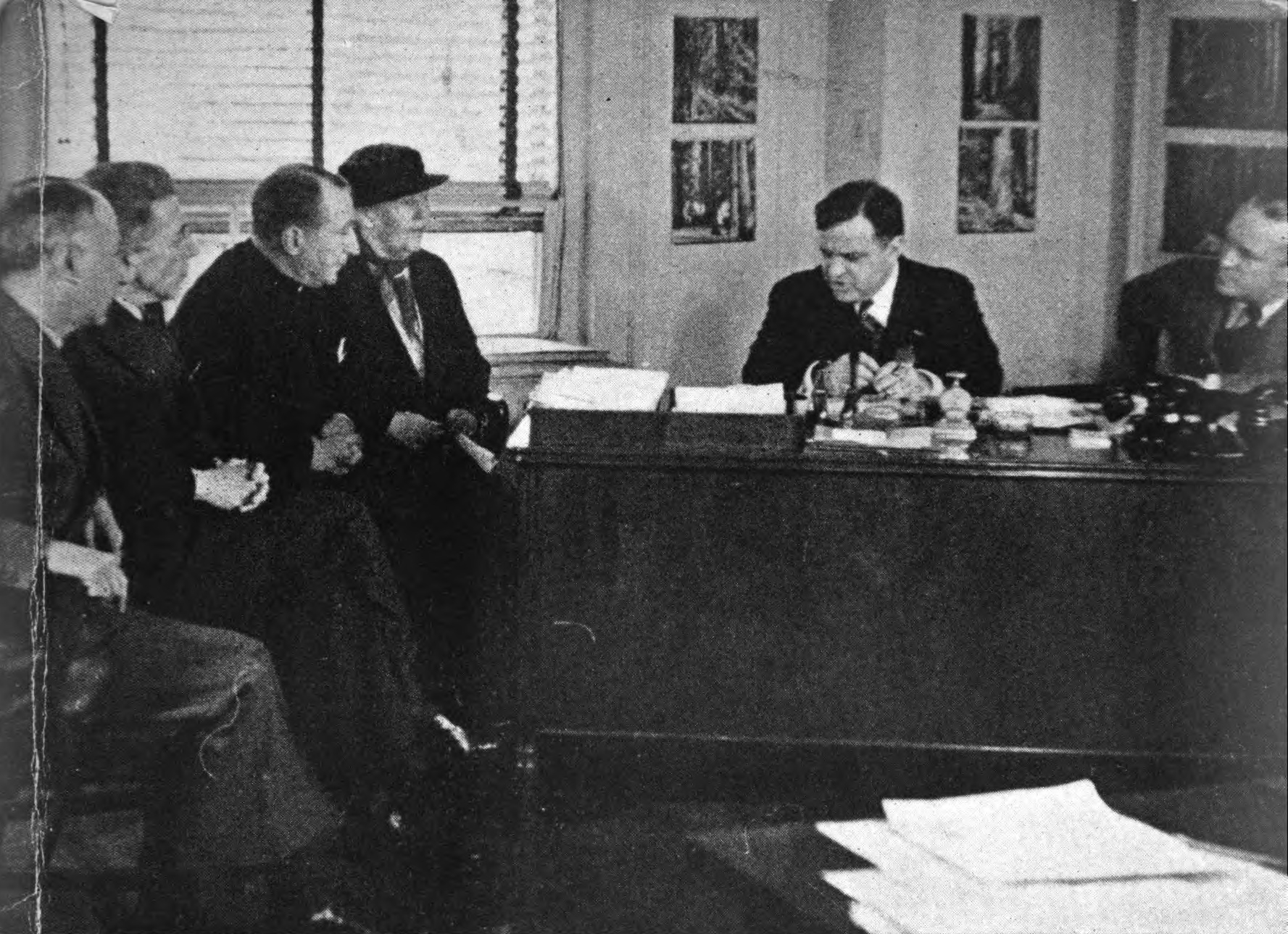
Members of the Housing Authority meet with mayor Fiorello La Guardia c. 1937. (L-R): Nathan Straus Jr., Baruch Charney Vladeck, Edward R. Moore, Mary Kingsbury Simkhovitch, Fiorello La Guardia, Langdon W. Post.

NYCHA was created in 1934 to help alleviate the housing crisis caused by the Great Depression during Mayor Fiorello H. LaGuardia's administration and was the first agency in the United States to provide publicly funded housing. The agency used the developments to practice slum-clearance and establish model affordable housing for the city. In 1935, NYCHA completed its first development, the First Houses, located on the Lower East Side of Manhattan. The parcel of land the houses were located on were purchased from Vincent Astor and the city used eminent domain to secure the remaining property. However, the construction of the First Houses used existing apartment buildings to renovate which proved too costly.

NYCHA's first two "new from the ground up" developments were Harlem River in 1937 and Williamsburg in 1938. Both are noted for their art-deco style of architecture, which are unique in public housing. These developments were segregated based on race with Harlem River being black-only and Williamsburg white-only.

The Authority boomed in partnership with Robert Moses after World War II as a part of Moses' plan to clear old tenements and remake New York as a modern city. Moses indicated later in life that he was disappointed at how the public housing system fell into decline and disrepair. The majority of NYCHA developments were built between 1945 and 1965. Unlike most cities, New York depended heavily on city and state funds to build its housing after the Federal Housing Act of 1937 expired and a new bill wasn't agreed upon until the Federal Housing Act of 1949, rather than just the federal government. Most of the postwar developments had over 1,000 apartment units each, and most were built in the modernist, tower-in-the-park style popular at the time. In the 1950s and 1960s, many New Yorkers, including supporters, became more critical of the agency and in response NYCHA introduced a new look that included variations of height, faster elevators, and larger apartments. In 1958, Mayor Robert F. Wagner Jr. began to shift construction away from megaprojects to smaller sites which retained the street grid and had under 1,000 units.

In 1964, NYCHA ended a policy that held apartments for white tenants in an attempt to integrate the developments. Tenants organized a rent strike in opposition to the policy and the State Commission of Human Rights questioned if the policy was in accordance to the state's laws on discrimination.

In 1995, the New York City Housing Authority Police Department and the New York City Transit Police were merged into the New York City Police Department by NYC Mayor Rudolph W. Giuliani and continues today as the New York City Police Department Housing Bureau.

== Governance and operations ==
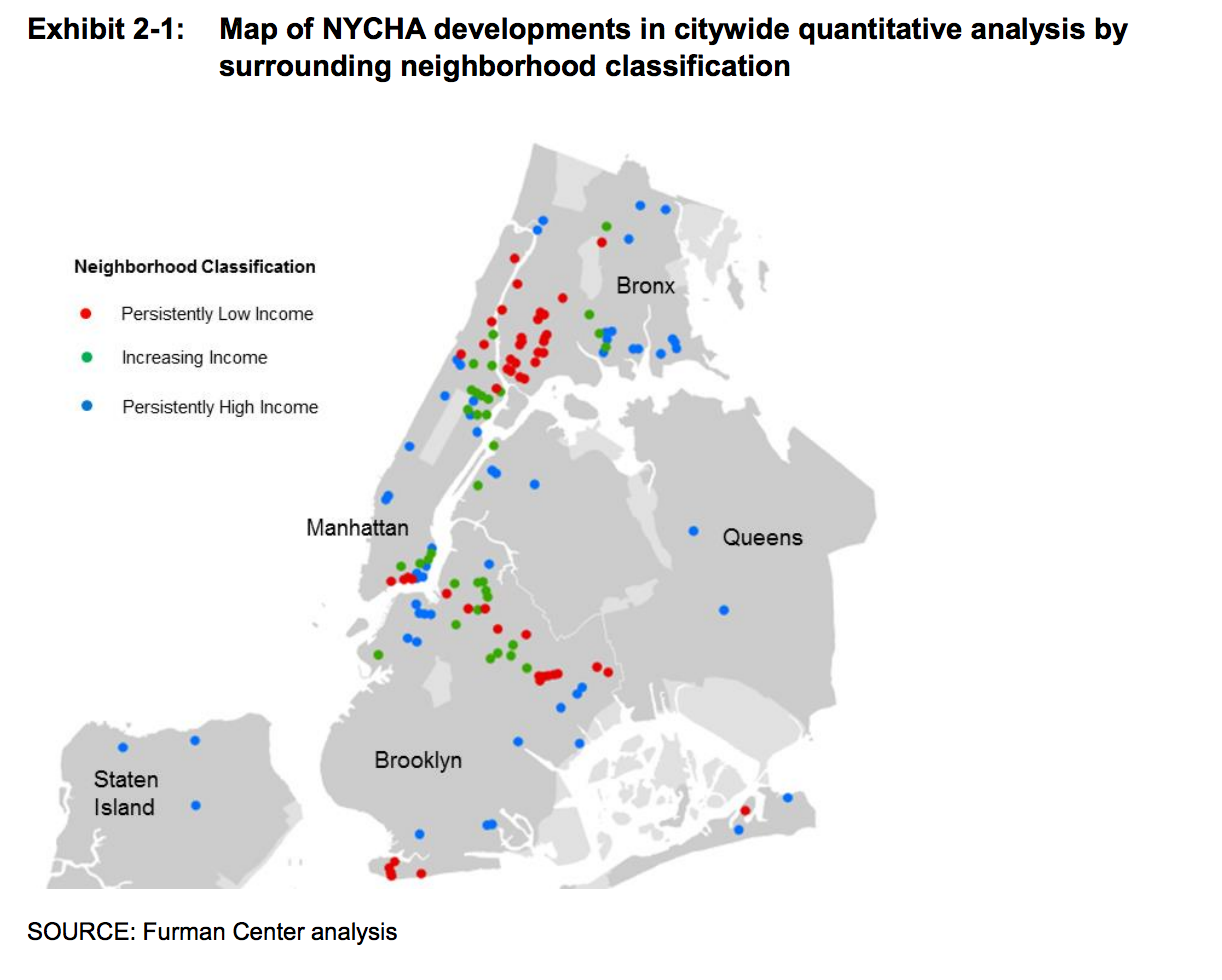
NYCHA Map

NYCHA is a public-benefit corporation, controlled by the Mayor of New York City, and organized under the State's Public Housing Law. The NYCHA ("NYCHA Board") consists of seven members, of which the chairman is appointed by and serves at the pleasure of the Mayor of New York City, while the others are appointed for three-year terms by the mayor. The board includes three members who are residents of public housing, and a board chair who also serves as NYCHA's chief executive officer.

On September 15, 2022, Mayor Eric Adams announced a new two person leadership structure for NYCHA with a split between the NYCHA Chair and CEO roles, with the CEO managing the day-to-day operations and the Chair overseeing the NYCHA Board.

The Authority is the largest public housing authority (PHA) in North America. In spite of many problems, it is still considered by experts to be the most successful big-city public housing authority in the country. Whereas most large public housing authorities in the United States (Chicago, St. Louis, Baltimore, etc.) have demolished their high-rise projects and in most cases replaced them with lower density housing, New York's continue to be fully occupied. Most of its market-rate housing is also in high-rise buildings.

NYCHA also administers a citywide Section 8 Leased Housing Program in rental apartments. However, new applications for Section 8 have not been accepted since December 10, 2009.

New York also maintains a long waiting list for its apartments. Because of demand, the Housing Authority in recent years, has selected more "working families" from applicants to diversify the income structure of occupants of its housing, as had been typical of residents who first occupied the facilities. NYCHA's Conventional Public Housing Program has 175,636 apartments (as of 2018) in 325 developments throughout the city.

NYCHA has approximately 13,000 employees serving about 173,946 families and approximately 392,259 authorized residents. Based on the 2010 census, NYCHA's Public Housing represents 8.2% of the city's rental apartments and is home to 4.9% of the city's population. NYCHA residents and Section 8 voucher holders combined occupy 12.4% of the city's rental apartments.

=== List of chairpersons ===
No.	Chairperson	Term	Mayor	Previous Position
1.	Langdon Post	February 17, 1934 – December 1, 1937	Fiorello H. La Guardia	U.S. Assistant Federal Relief Administrator
2.	Alfred Rheinstein	December 17, 1937 – October 9, 1939	Fiorello H. La Guardia	Chairman & CEO, Rheinstein Construction Company
3.	Gerard Swope	December 11, 1939 – January 26, 1942	Fiorello H. La Guardia	President, General Electric Company
4.	Edmond Borgia Butler	May 2, 1942 – July 1, 1947	Fiorello H. La Guardia	Professor, Fordham University Law School
5.	Thomas Francis Farrell	July 1, 1947 – September 15, 1950	William O'Dwyer	Chief of Field Operations, The Manhattan Project
6.	Philip J. Cruise	September 15, 1950 – April 3, 1958	Vincent R. Impellitteri (acting mayor)	Assistant Chairman, New York City Housing Authority
7.	William Reid	April 1958 – December 31, 1965	Robert F. Wagner Jr.	Chairman, Hudson and Manhattan Railroad
8.	Missing Name	January 1966 –		
9.	Gerald J. Carey	1966	John V. Lindsay	General manager, New York City Housing Authority
10.	Walter Edward Washington	1966 – 1967	John V. Lindsay	Exec. Dir. National Capital Housing Authority, DC
11.	Albert Walsh	October 31, 1967 – January 7, 1970	John V. Lindsay	Deputy Commissioner, NYS Division Housing & Urban Renewal
12.	Simeon Golar	January 16, 1970 – May 31, 1973	John V. Lindsay	Chairman, NYC Commission on Human Rights
13.	Joseph J. Christian	1973 – December 31, 1985	John V. Lindsay, Abraham D. Beame, Edward I. Koch	Commissioner of Development, NYC Housing and Development Administration
14.	Emanuel P. Popolizio	January 4, 1986 – November 1990	Edward I. Koch	Chairman, NYC Conciliation and Appeals Board
15.	Laura D. Blackburne	November 1990 – February 22, 1992	David N. Dinkins	President & CEO, Institute for Mediation and Conflict Resolution, NYC
16.	Sally B. Hernandez-Pinero	February 22, 1992 – January 1994	David N. Dinkins	NYC Deputy Mayor for Finance and Economic Development
17.	Ruben Franco	January 31, 1994 – January 7, 1999	Rudy Giuliani	Pres. and General Counsel, Puerto Rican Legal Defense and Education Fund
18.	John G. Martinez	April 19, 1999 – April 1, 2001	Rudy Giuliani	First Vice-president, Paine Webber Inc.
19.	Tino Hernandez	April 1, 2001 – December 12, 2008	Rudy Giuliani, Michael R. Bloomberg	Commissioner, New York City Department of Juvenile Justice
20.	Ricardo Elias Morales	December 15, 2008 – May 13, 2009	Michael R. Bloomberg	NYCHA General Counsel & Chief Ethics Officer
21.	John B. Rhea	June 1, 2009 – December 30, 2013	Michael R. Bloomberg	Managing Director & Co-Head of Global Consumer/Retail Group, Barclays Capital
22.	Shola Olatoye	February 8, 2014 – April 30, 2018	Bill de Blasio	Vice Pres. & NY Market Leader, Enterprise Community Partners, Inc.
*	Derrick Cephas (Acting Chair*)	May 4, 2018 – May 31, 2018	Bill de Blasio	Vice Chair of NYCHA Board of Directors
*	Stanley Brezenoff (Interim Chair & CEO*)	June 1, 2018 – February 15, 2019	Bill de Blasio	Interim CEO, NYC Health and Hospitals Corporation
*	Kathryn Garcia (Interim Chair & CEO*)	February 5, 2019 – July, 2019	Bill de Blasio	Commissioner, NYC Department of Sanitation (continuing as)
23.	Gregory Russ	Appointed June 18, 2019, effective August 12, 2019 – September 19, 2022	Bill de Blasio, Eric Adams	Executive director & CEO, Minneapolis Public Housing Authority
*	Lisa Bova-Hiatt (Interim CEO*)	September 19, 2022 – July 6, 2023	Eric Adams	NYCHA Executive Vice President of Legal Affairs and General Counsel
24.	Lisa Bova-Hiatt (CEO) Jamie Rubin (Board Chair)	July 6, 2023 –	Eric Adams, Zohran Mamdani	NYCHA Interim CEO (Lisa Bova-Hiatt), Chief Investment Officer (CIO) Aligned Climate Capital (Jamie Rubin)

== Capital needs ==
In 2004, NYCHA contracted with the Architectural/Engineering firm Parsons Brinckerhoff Quade and Douglas to perform a needs assessment survey of all 2500+ properties owned by the agency (excluding FHA Homes, which were inspected by in-house NYCHA personnel in about 2007). In 2005, a report was released detailing the conditions of every aspect and building component of each individual property, based on a scale of 1 to 5 (in this case, 1 being the highest or best rating, and 5 being the lowest, or poorest rating). This report identified $6.9 billion in needs required to bring the Authority's structures into a state of good repair. In 2011/12, a second needs assessment survey was done by PBQ&D, which identified $16.5 billion in needs. This represented an average of $93,000 per unit. It is anticipated that an upcoming needs assessment contract will reveal capital needs in excess of $25 billion. The needs assessment survey is divided into five broad categories, which are: Architectural, Mechanical, Electrical, Site, and Apartments. Given the large number of apartment units within NYCHA, the report's findings on apartments are based upon an inspection of 5% of NYCHA's total inventory.

In mid-2007, NYCHA faced a $225 million budget shortfall.

In late 2015, NYCHA announced the formation of the Fund for Public Housing, a nonprofit organization that will seek to raise $200 million over three years to supplement NYCHA's efforts and improve the lives of NYC public housing residents. The Fund received its first donation of $100,000 from the Deutsche Bank in December 2015. Also in 2015 Mayor Bill de Blasio released a plan called Next Gen NYCHA to address funding and maintenance concerns by "revamping management practices and generate revenue by building mixed-income and affordable housing on what the city deemed underused NYCHA land, and by using new federal programs to shift NYCHA apartments over to Section 8, a more stable source of federal funding".

In 2018, a city-wide survey of NYCHA properties found that the organization needs $31.8 billion over five years to address unmet capital repairs including replacing broken elevators, upgrading faulty heating systems, and fix run-down kitchens and bathrooms. Despite its needed repairs, the Department of Housing and Urban Development (HUD) is cutting the agency's budget to encourage NYCHA to rely on partnerships with private property managers while Governor Andrew Cuomo is withholding his multiyear funding of $550 million until a federally required monitor is appointed to oversee the housing authority. Later that year, the de Blasio administration announced a plan, called NYCHA 2.0, to address the capital needs of the agency which includes converting 62,000 NYCHA apartments into Section 8 and bringing in private management to oversee the backlog of repairs for the apartments, and selling air rights over NYCHA property to raise money. The conversion of the properties would be under the Rental Assistance Demonstration (RAD) federal program leading to concerns that NYCHA would be privatized. If units were to be brought under RAD, oversight by the monitor and the court would be terminated leading to further concerns that the mold remediation ordered in the 2013 Baez lawsuit wouldn't happen.

In 2019, the administration, under NYCHA 2.0, began considering demolishing and rebuilding the Fulton Houses in Chelsea and the Cooper Park Houses in Williamsburg through partnering with private developers and a 70–30 split of market-rate and affordable housing. Other developers began lobbying the city for air rights from Campos Plaza II, Fulton Houses, and the Ingersoll Houses.

The approach of the administration, under NYCHA 2.0, is a turn back to Bloomberg-era initiatives of market rate infill that he once felt ignored the concerns of NYCHA residents after a failed trial of four buildings with a 50–50 split of market-rate and low-cost housing infill did not provide enough money under Next-Gen NYCHA. Then in July, 2020 NYCHA announced a new plan called A Blueprint for Change which would transfer 110,000 apartments to a newly created public entity - a Public Housing Preservation Trust. In February, 2021 the Chelsea NYCHA Working Group released their plan for the Elliott-Chelsea Houses and the Fulton Houses and the city released an RFP for it.

== Hurricane Sandy and its impact on NYCHA ==
In October, 2012, Hurricane Sandy turned out to be the single most destructive event in the history of the New York City Housing Authority. The storm impacted approximately 10% of NYCHA's developments, which left 400 buildings without power, and 386 buildings without heat and hot water.

In February 2014, NYCHA's Recovery and Resilience Department was created bringing about initial agreements in over $3 billion in funding for over 33 developments by March 2015. In August 2015, the first construction began on Lower East Side V. In December 2015, NYCHA received $3 billion in disaster recovery funding and by December 2016, $201 million of construction was underway. By December 2017, $1.85 billion in contracts were awarded, and construction was underway at 27 developments. Construction at all Sandy-impacted sites are expected to be completed by the end of 2021.

== Lawsuits ==
=== Tenant lawsuit ===
In February 2018, attorney Jim Walden filed a lawsuit on behalf of 400,000 NYCHA tenants living in squalid conditions. The suit demands that the court appoint an independent monitor to oversee NYCHA because the agency failed to provide tenants with heat and hot water, keep residents safe from lead, involve tenants in policy-making, and hire residents, as required under federal law. In April 2018, under intense pressure from the lawsuit, chairwoman Shola Olatoye resigned.

=== Federal lawsuit ===
On June 11, 2018, U.S. Attorney Geoffrey Berman filed a lawsuit accusing NYCHA of violating health and safety regulations, exposing children to lead paint, and training its workers to deceive inspectors under the oversight of chairwoman Shola Olatoye from 2012 to 2016. According to federal prosecutors, deceptions NYCHA workers used included shutting off buildings' water supplies during inspections to hide leaks and building false walls out of plywood to hide dilapidated rooms from inspectors. That day, NYCHA settled the lawsuit by admitting to the allegations, agreeing to spend an additional $1 billion over the next four years, and by agreeing to oversight by a federal monitor. In 2019, the federal government reached an agreement with the city to appoint a federal monitor and $2.2 billion spent by the city over the next decade on repair to avoid a federal takeover. In February 2019, federal officials chose Bart Schwartz as the NYCHA monitor.

== List of properties ==
This is a list of buildings held by the New York City Housing Authority, a public corporation that provides affordable housing in New York City, New York, U.S. This list is divided geographically by the five boroughs of New York City: Manhattan, the Bronx, Brooklyn, Queens, and Staten Island.

=== Manhattan ===
NYCHA Developments in Manhattan
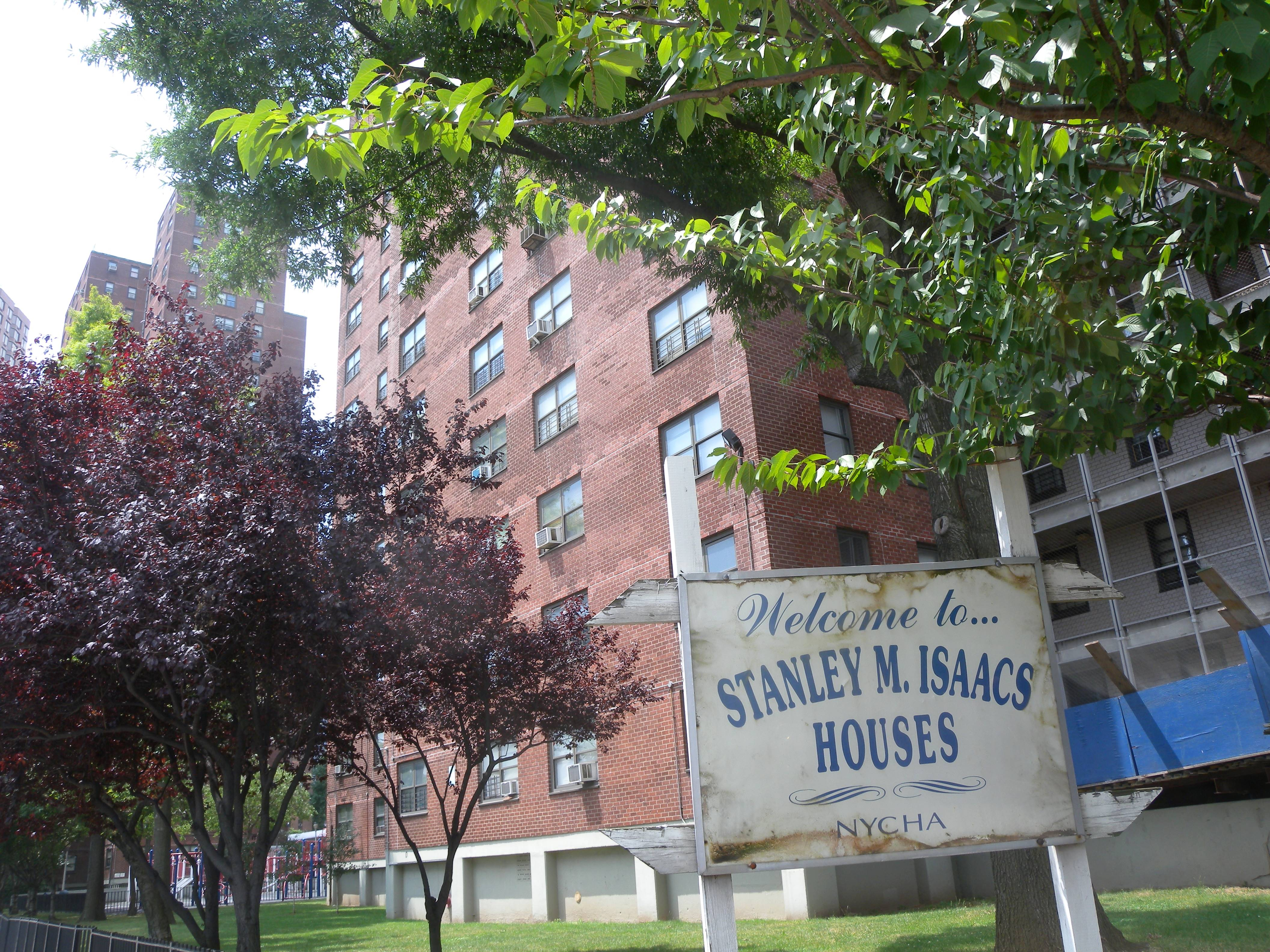
Isaacs Houses, Yorkville / East Harlem

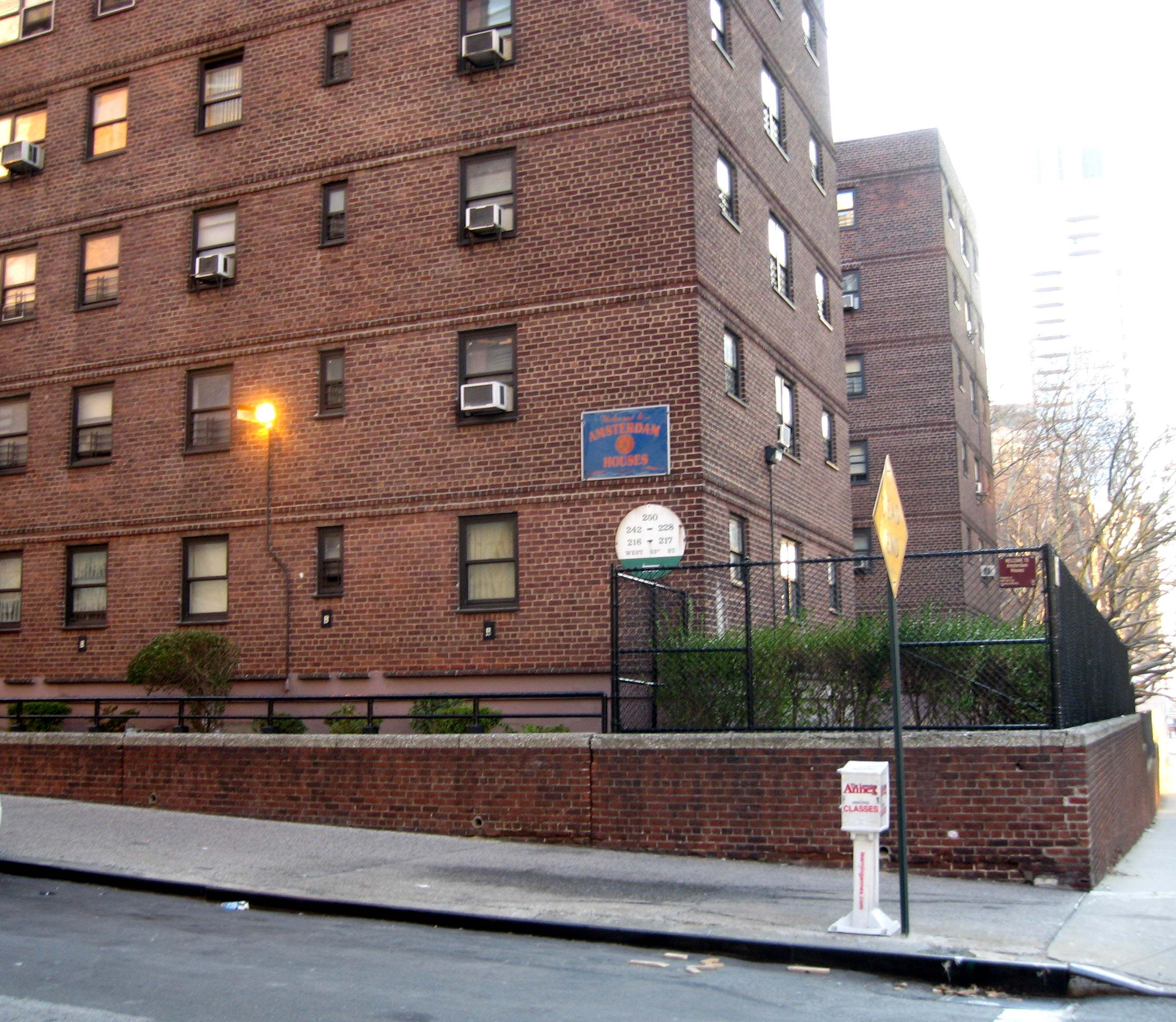
Amsterdam Houses, Upper West Side

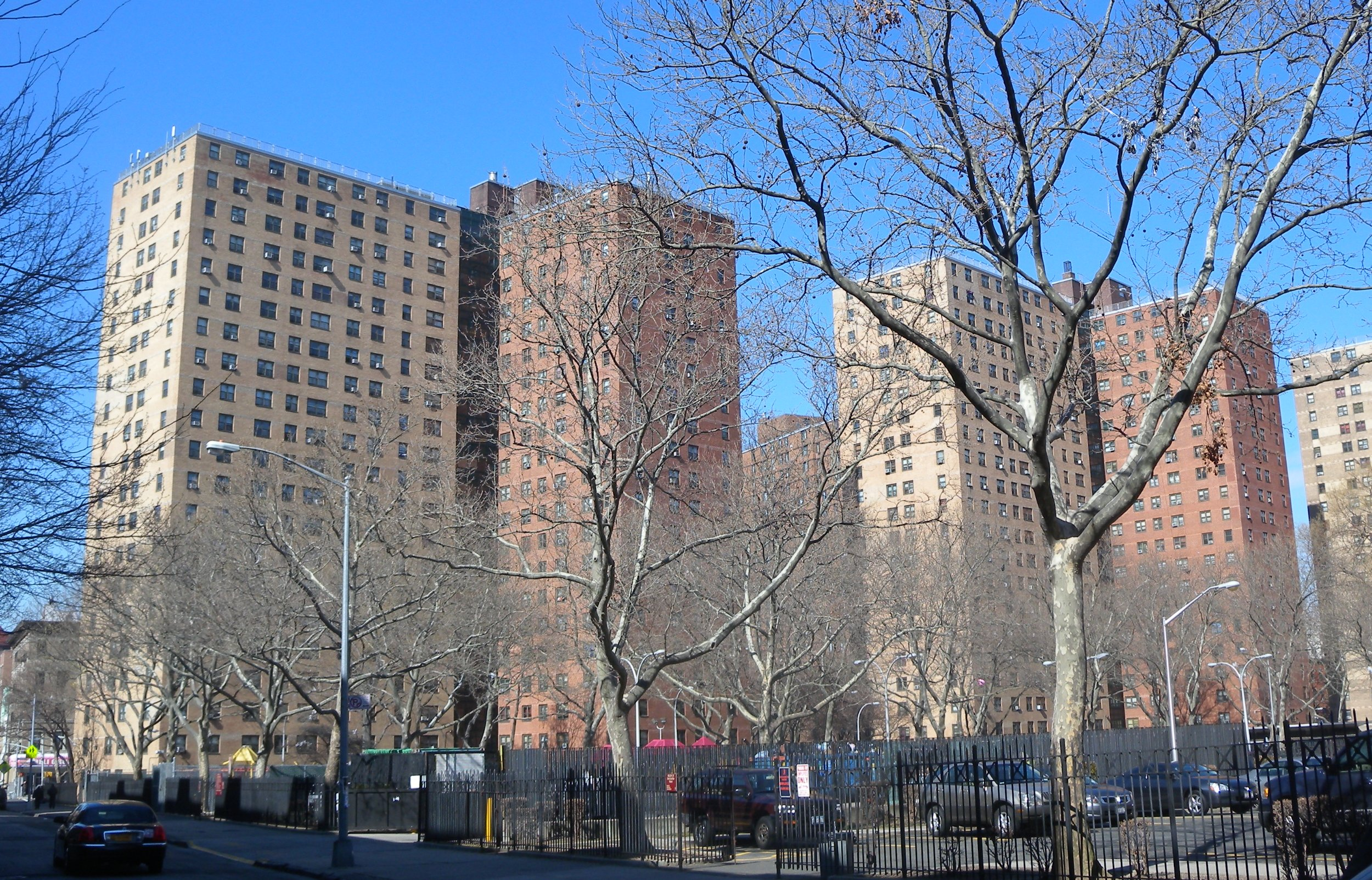
Drew-Hamilton Houses, Harlem

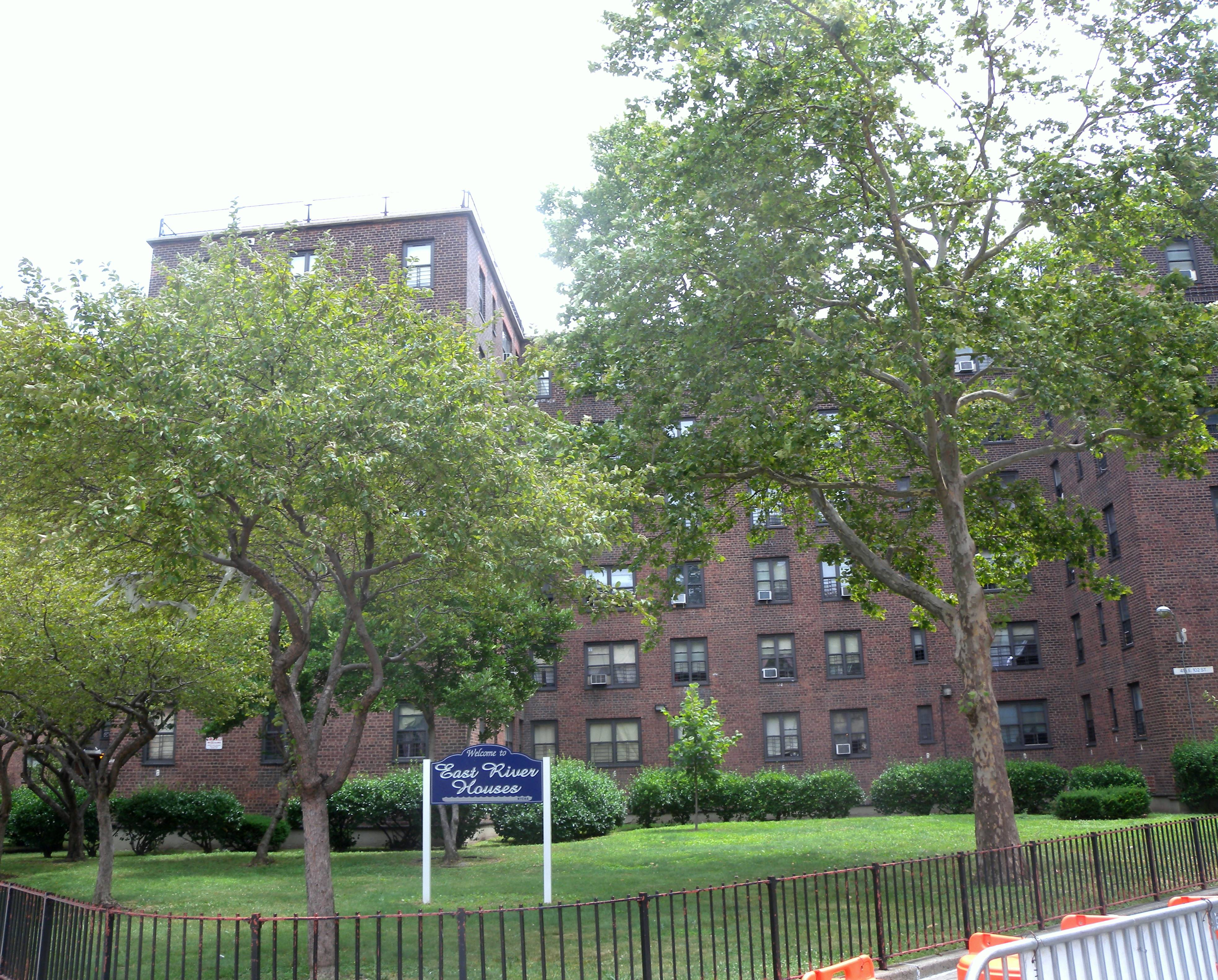
East River Houses, Spanish Harlem

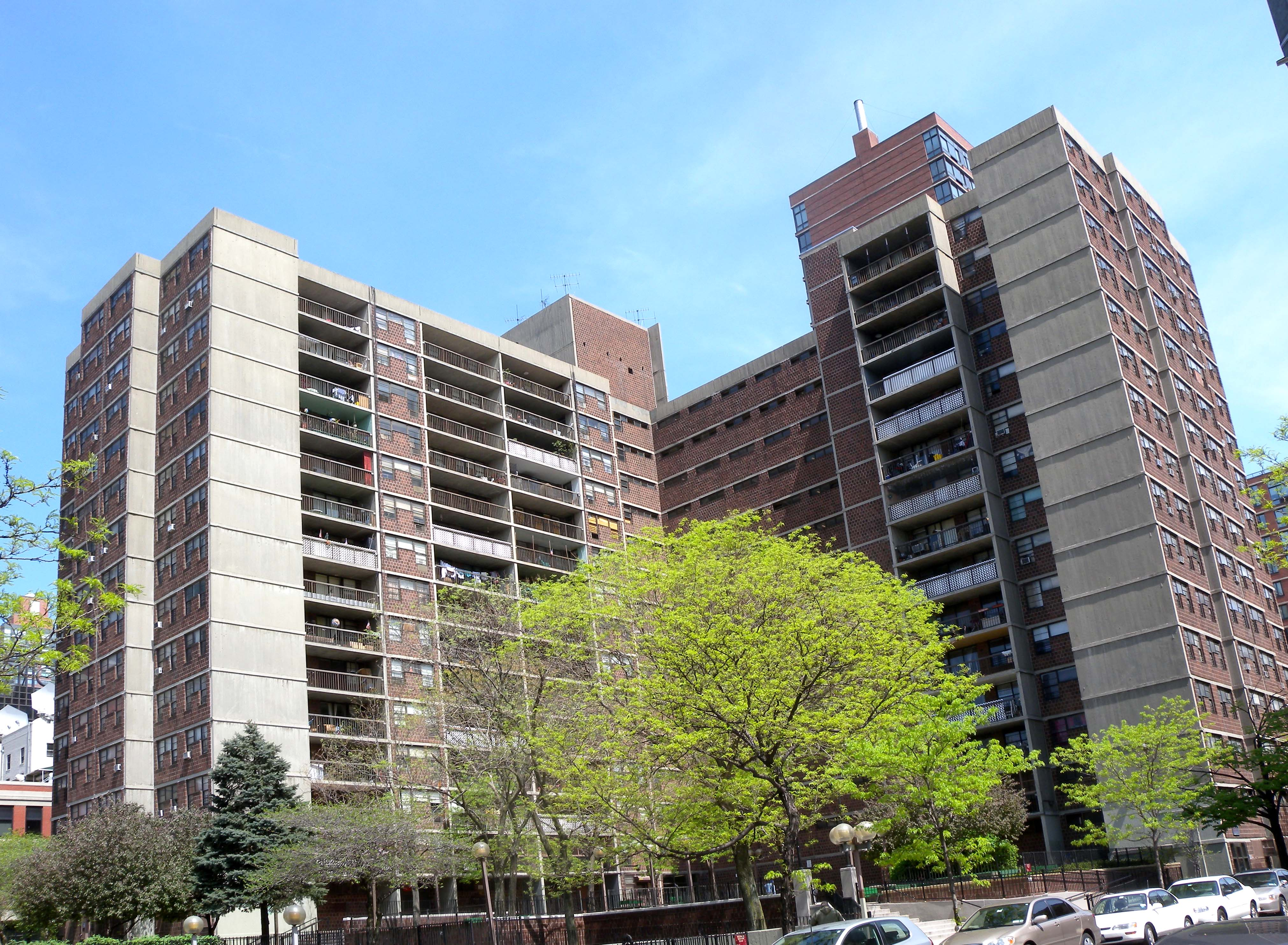
Harborview Terrace, Hell's Kitchen

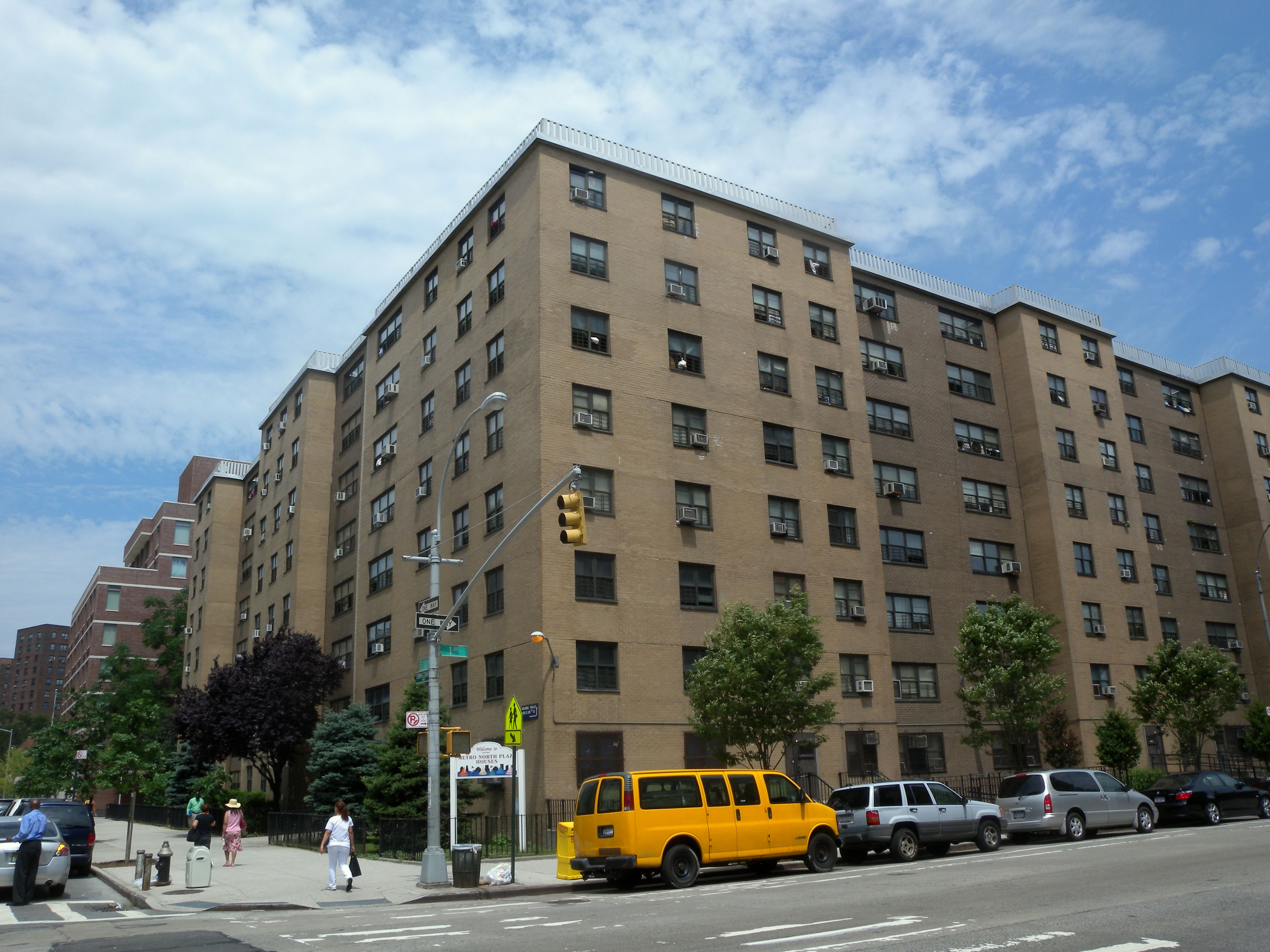
Metro North Plaza, Spanish Harlem

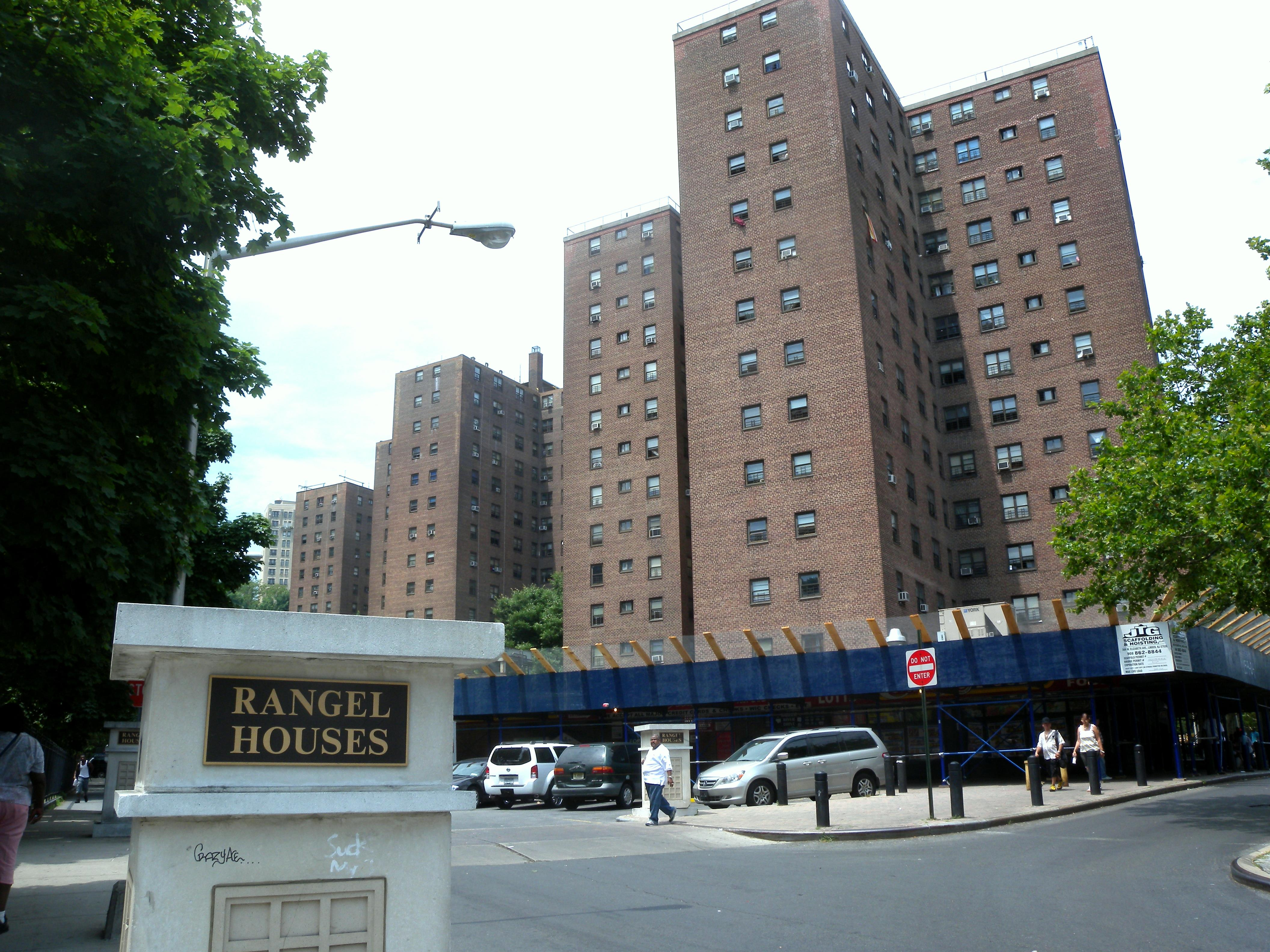
Rangel Houses, Harlem

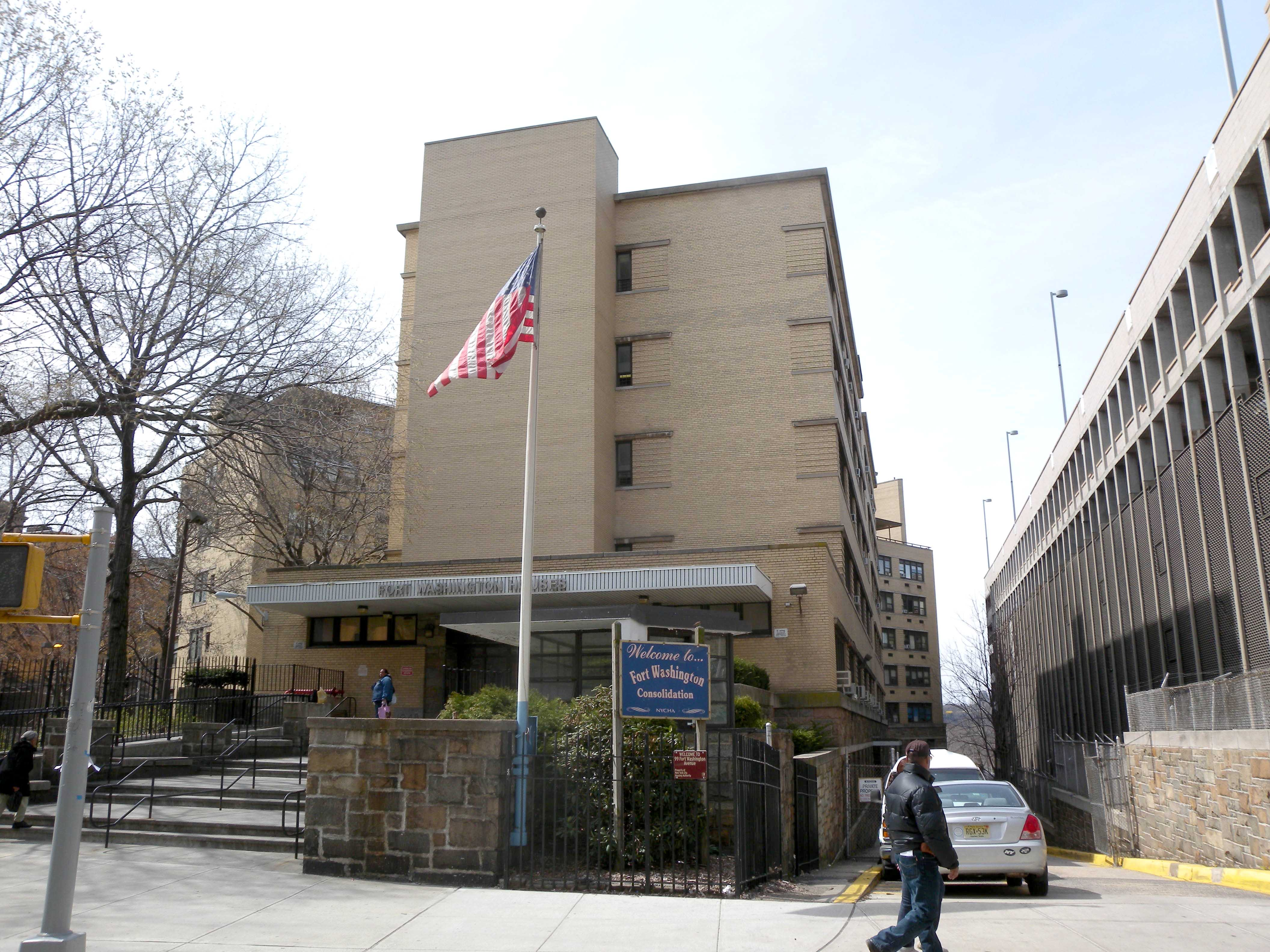
Fort Washington Ave Rehab, Washington Heights

NYCHA Property	Neighborhood/Subsection	No.# of Buildings	No.# of Stories	No.# of Apartments	Date of Completion	Date of Demolition	Notes
131 Saint Nicholas Avenue	Harlem	1	17	98	March 31, 1965		
154 West 84th Street	Upper West Side	1	7	35	March 31, 1996		
335 East 111th Street	East Harlem	1	6	66	June 30, 1969		
344 East 28th Street	Kips Bay	1	26	225	March 31, 1971		
45 Allen Street	Lower East Side	1	14	106	July 31, 1974		
830 Amsterdam Avenue	Upper West Side	1	20	158	August 31, 1965		
Alfred E. Smith Houses	Lower East Side	12	17	1,931	October 30, 1950		
Audubon Houses	Washington Heights	1	20	167	April 30, 1962		
Amsterdam Addition	Upper West Side	1	27	175	January 31, 1974		
Amsterdam Houses	Upper West Side	13	6 and 13	1,080	December 17, 1948		
Baruch Addition	Lower East Side	1	23	197	April 30, 1977		Senior-Only Housing
Baruch Houses	Lower East Side	17	8 and 14	2,193	June 30, 1959		
Bethune Gardens	Washington Heights	1	22	210	March 31, 1967		
Bracetti Plaza	East Village	1	7	108	May 31, 1974		
Campos Plaza	East Village	2	10 and 20	270	September 30, 1979		
Campos Plaza II	East Village	2	9 and 17	223	April 30, 1983		
Carver Houses	East Harlem	13	6 and 15	1,246	January 31, 1958		
Chelsea Houses	Chelsea	2	21	426	May 31, 1964		Combined with Elliott Houses
Chelsea Addition	Chelsea	1	14	96	April 30, 1968		Senior-Only Housing; Combined with Elliot Houses
Clinton Houses	East Harlem	6	9 and 18	749	October 31, 1965		
Corsi Houses	East Harlem	1	16	171	November 30, 1973		Senior-Only Housing
De Hostos Apartments	Upper West Side	1	22	219	February 28, 1969		
Drew-Hamilton Houses	Harlem	5	21	1,207	September 30, 1965		
Dyckman Houses	Inwood	7	14 and 15	1,167	April 25, 1951		
East 4th Street Rehab	Lower East Side	2	6	25	August 1, 1988		
East 120th Street Rehab	East Harlem	1	6	42	November 1, 1985		
East River Houses	East Harlem	10	6, 10 and 11	1,158	May 20, 1941		
Elliott Houses	Chelsea	4	11 and 12	608	July 15, 1947		
Fabria Houses	East Village	3	5	40	May 1, 1985		
First Houses	East Village	8	4 and 5	126	May 31, 1936		Oldest public housing development out of all of the boroughs in the city.
Fort Washington Ave Rehab	Washington Heights	1	7	226	September 30, 1984		Senior-Only Housing
Frederick Douglass Addition	Upper West Side	1	16	135	June 30, 1965		
Frederick Douglass Houses	Upper West Side	17	5, 9, 12, 17, 18 and 20	2,054	May 31, 1958		
Frederick E. Samuel Apartments	Harlem	40	5, 6 and 7	659	August 31, 1994		
Frederick E. Samuel Apartments M.H.O.P. I	Harlem	5	5	31	January 31, 1994		
Frederick E. Samuel Apartments M.H.O.P. II	Harlem	1	5	10	July 31, 1993		
Frederick E. Samuel Apartments M.H.O.P. III	Harlem	1	5	10	June 30, 1995		
Fulton Houses	Chelsea	11	6 and 25	945	March 31, 1965		
Gaylord White Houses	East Harlem	1	20	247	September 30, 1964		
Gompers Houses	Lower East Side	2	20	474	April 30, 1964		
Grampion Houses	Harlem	1	7	35	May 31, 1977		
Grant Houses	Manhattanville	9	13 and 21	1,940	September 30, 1957		
Harborview Terrace	Clinton	2	14 and 15	377	June 30, 1977		
Harlem River Houses	Harlem	7	4 and 5	571	October 1, 1937		
Harlem River II	Harlem	1	15	114	October 31, 1965		
Hernandez Houses	Lower East Side	1	17	149	August 31, 1971		
Holmes Towers	Yorkville	2	25	537	April 30, 1969		
Isaacs Houses	Yorkville	3	24	635	July 31, 1965		
Jackie Robinson Houses	East Harlem	1	8	189	May 31, 1973		
Jefferson Houses	East Harlem	18	7, 13 and 14	1,487	June 30, 1959		
Johnson Houses	East Harlem	10	14	1,308	December 27, 1948		
King Towers	Harlem	10	13 and 14	1,373	October 31, 1954		
LaGuardia Addition	Lower East Side	1	16	150	August 31, 1965		Senior-Only Housing
LaGuardia Houses	Lower East Side	9	16	1,093	July 31, 1957		
Lehman Village	East Harlem	4	20	619	November 30, 1963		
Lexington Houses	Harlem	4	14	448	March 16, 1951		
Lincoln Houses	Harlem	14	6 and 14	1,282	December 29, 1948		
Lower East Side II	Lower East Side	4	3	188	November 1, 1988		
Lower East Side III	Lower East Side	2	4	56	April 30, 1997		
Lower East Side Rehab	Lower East Side	2	6	55	December 1, 1986		
Lower East Side I Infill	Lower East Side	5	4 and 9	189	April 30, 1988		
Madison Avenue Houses	Harlem	12	5	114			Disposed
Manhattanville Houses	Manhattanville	6	20	1,272	June 30, 1961		
Manhattanville Rehab (Group 2)	Manhattanville	3	5 and 6	46	November 1, 1988		
Manhattanville Rehab (Group 3)	Manhattanville	2	5 and 6	51	September 30, 1983		
Marshall Plaza	Washington Heights	1	20	180	June 30, 1986		
Meltzer Tower	East Village	1	20	230	August 31, 1971		
Metro North Plaza	East Harlem	3	7, 8 and 11	269	August 31, 1971		
Metro North Rehab	East Harlem	17	6	321	September 30, 1989		
Milbank-Frawley	East Harlem	2	5 and 6	82	July 31, 1988		
Park Avenue-East 122nd and 123rd Streets Houses	East Harlem	2	6	89	March 31, 1970		
Polo Grounds Towers	Harlem	4	30	1,614	June 30, 1968		
Public School 139 Houses	Harlem	1	5	125	October 8, 1986		
Rangel Houses	Harlem	8	14	984	September 30, 1951		
Riis Houses	East Village	13	6, 13 and 14	1,187	January 17, 1949		
Riis II	East Village	6	6, 13 and 14	577	January 31, 1949		
Robbins Plaza	Lenox Hill	1	20	150	February 28, 1975		Senior-Only Housing
Robert F. Wagner Houses	East Harlem	22	7 and 16	2,154	May 31, 1958		
Rutgers Houses	Lower East Side	5	20	721	March 31, 1965		
Seward Park Extension	Lower East Side	2	23	360	October 31, 1973		
St. Nicholas Houses	Harlem	13	14	1,523	September 30, 1954		
Stanton Street Houses	Lower East Side	1	6	13	December 1, 2003		
Straus Houses	Kips Bay	2	19 and 20	267	January 31, 1965		
Taft Houses	East Harlem	9	19	1,464	December 31, 1962		
Two Bridges URA (SITE 7)	Two Bridges	1	26	250	April 30, 1975		
UPACA (Site 5) Houses	East Harlem	1	11	180	July 3, 1986		
UPACA (Site 6) Houses	East Harlem	1	12	150	November 30, 1987		
Vladeck Houses I	Lower East Side	20	6	250	November 25, 1940		
Vladeck Houses II	Lower East Side	4	6	238	October 25, 1940		
Wald Houses	Lower East Side	16	10, 11, 13 and 14	1,857	October 14, 1949		
Washington Heights Rehab (Groups 1 & 2)	Washington Heights	5	5 and 6	216	May 1, 1988		
Washington Heights Rehab Phase III (Fort Washington)	Washington Heights	7	5	88	November 30, 1987		
Washington Heights Rehab Phase III (Harlem River)	Washington Heights	1	5	14	November 30, 1987		
Washington Heights Rehab Phase IV (C)	Washington Heights	2	5	32	October 1, 1990		
Washington Heights Rehab Phase IV (D)	Washington Heights	2	5	32	July 1, 1990		
Washington Houses	East Harlem	14	12 and 14	1,510	July 31, 1957		
Wilson Houses	East Harlem	3	20	398	June 30, 1961		
Wise Houses	Upper West Side	2	19	399	January 31, 1965		
WSUR Brownstones	Upper West Side	36	3, 4, and 6	236	June 30, 1968		
WSUR (Site A) Houses	Upper West Side	1	9	68	September 30, 1965		
WSUR (Site B) Houses	Upper West Side	1	22	167	September 30, 1965		
WSUR (Site C) Houses	Upper West Side	1	18	157	September 30, 1965		

=== Bronx ===
NYCHA Developments in the Bronx
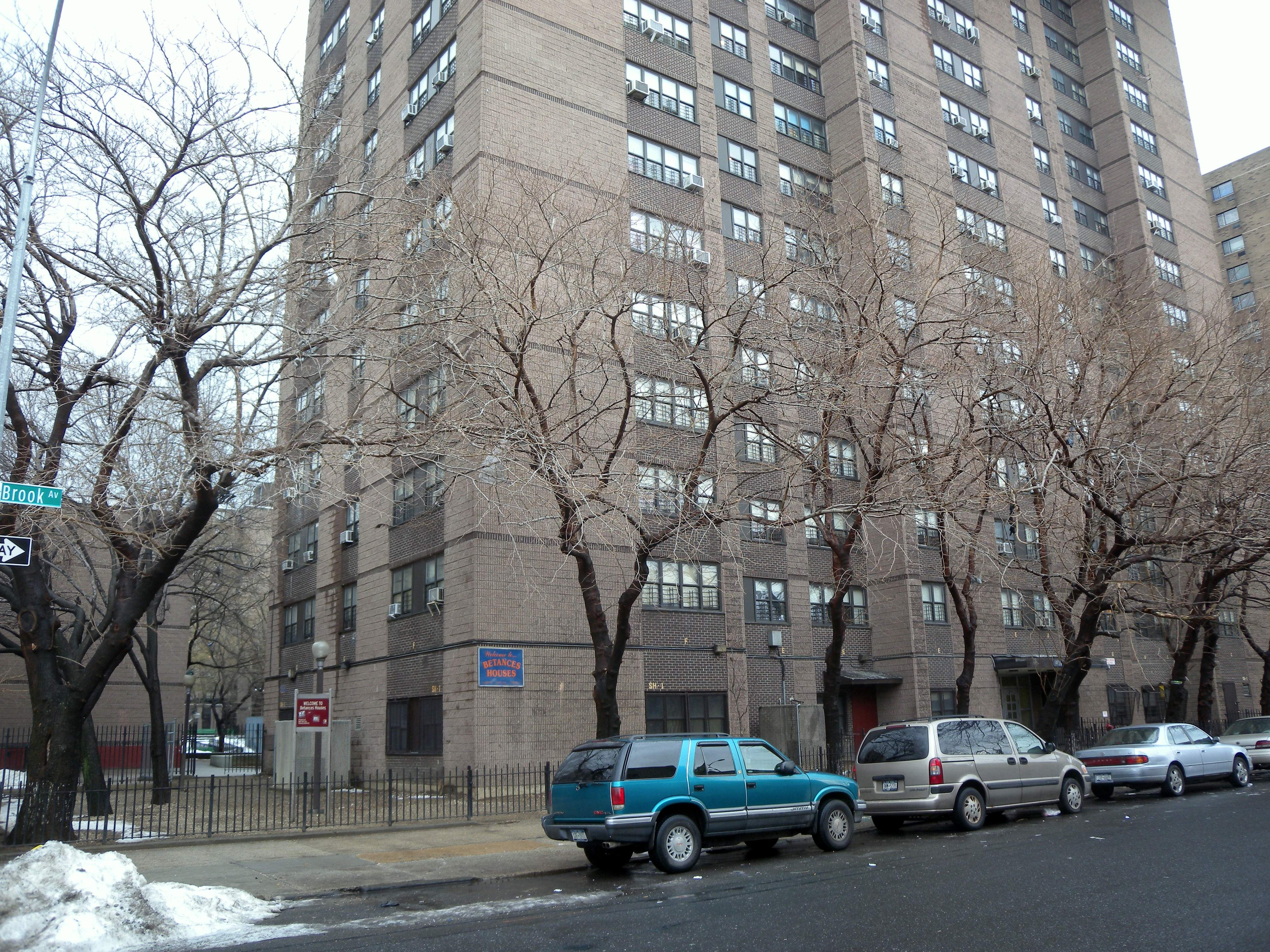
Dr. Ramon E. Betances Houses, Mott Haven

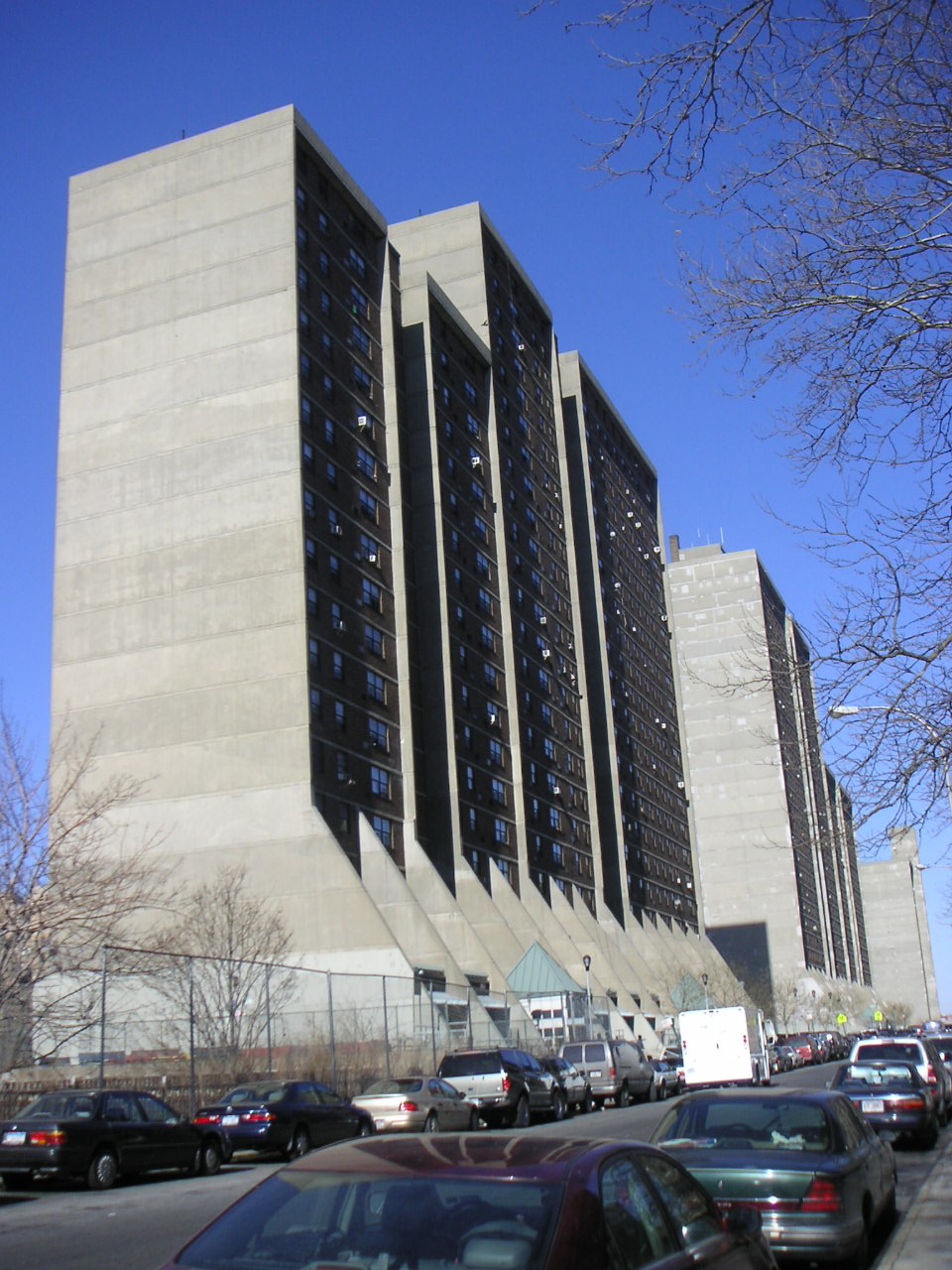
Morrisania Air Rights, Melrose

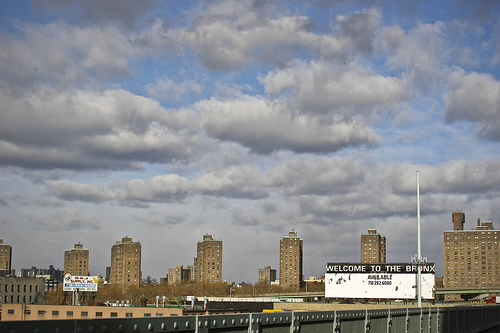
Mill Brook Houses, Mott Haven

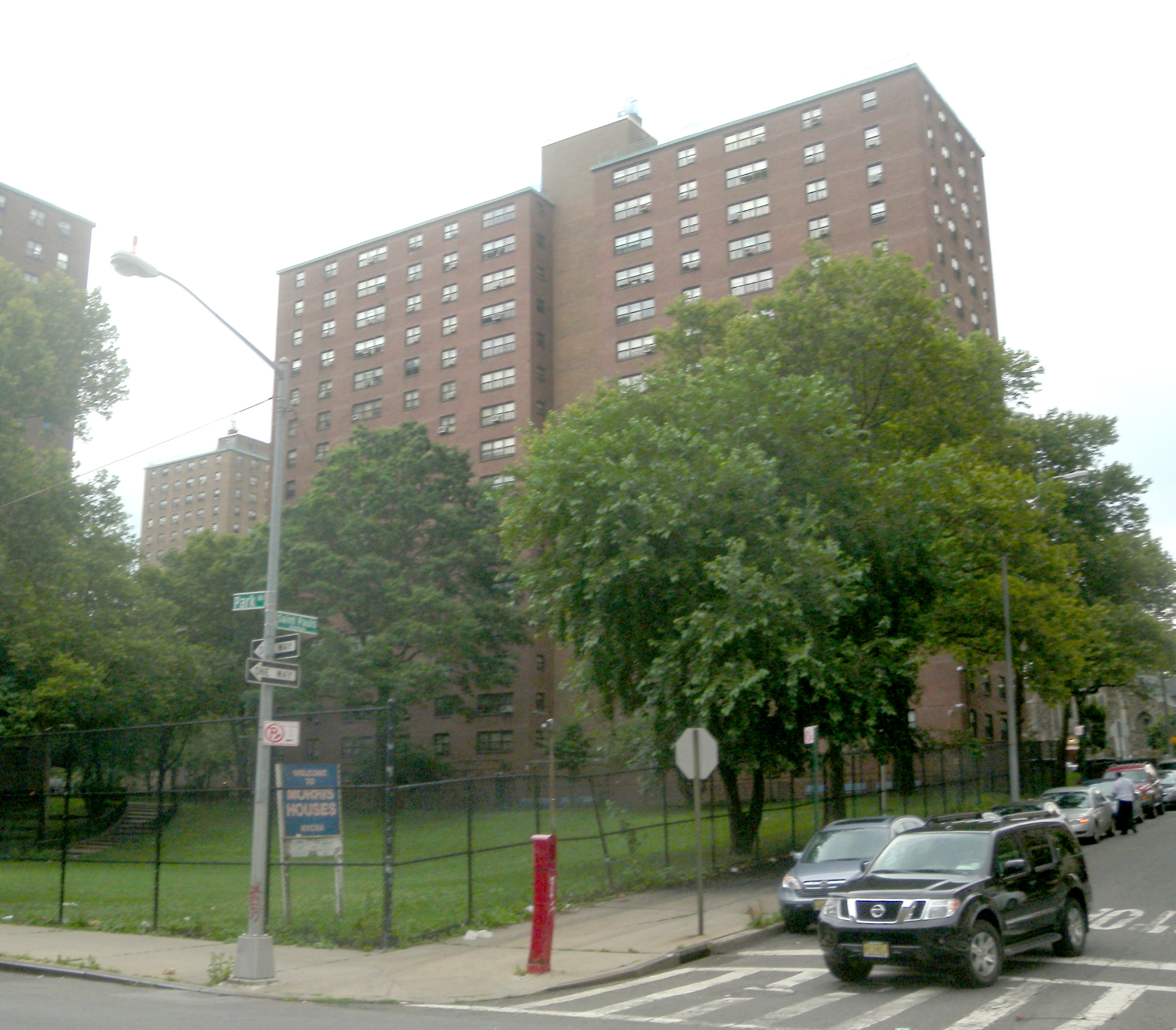
Morris Houses, Morrisania

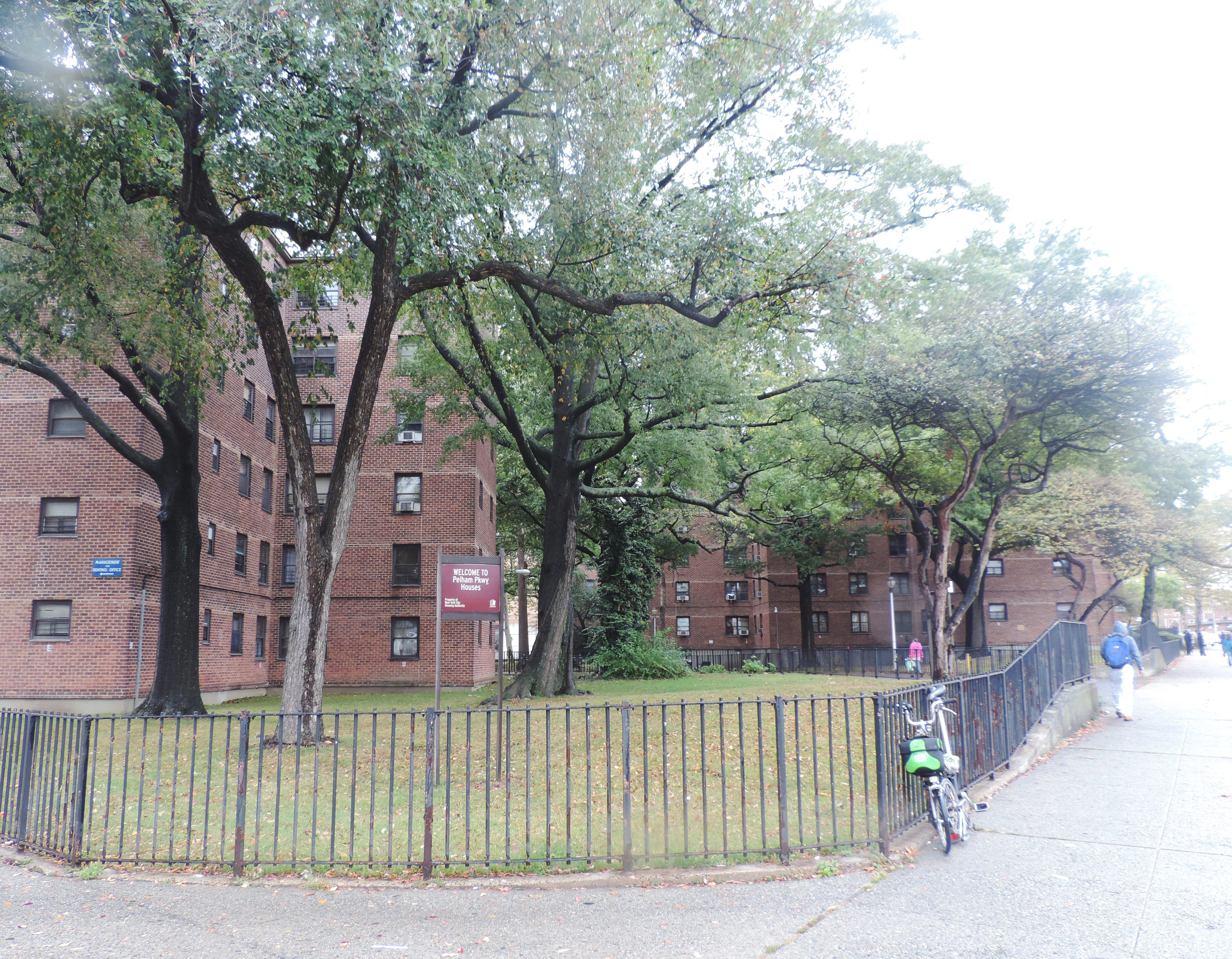
Pelham Pkwy Houses, Pelham Parkway

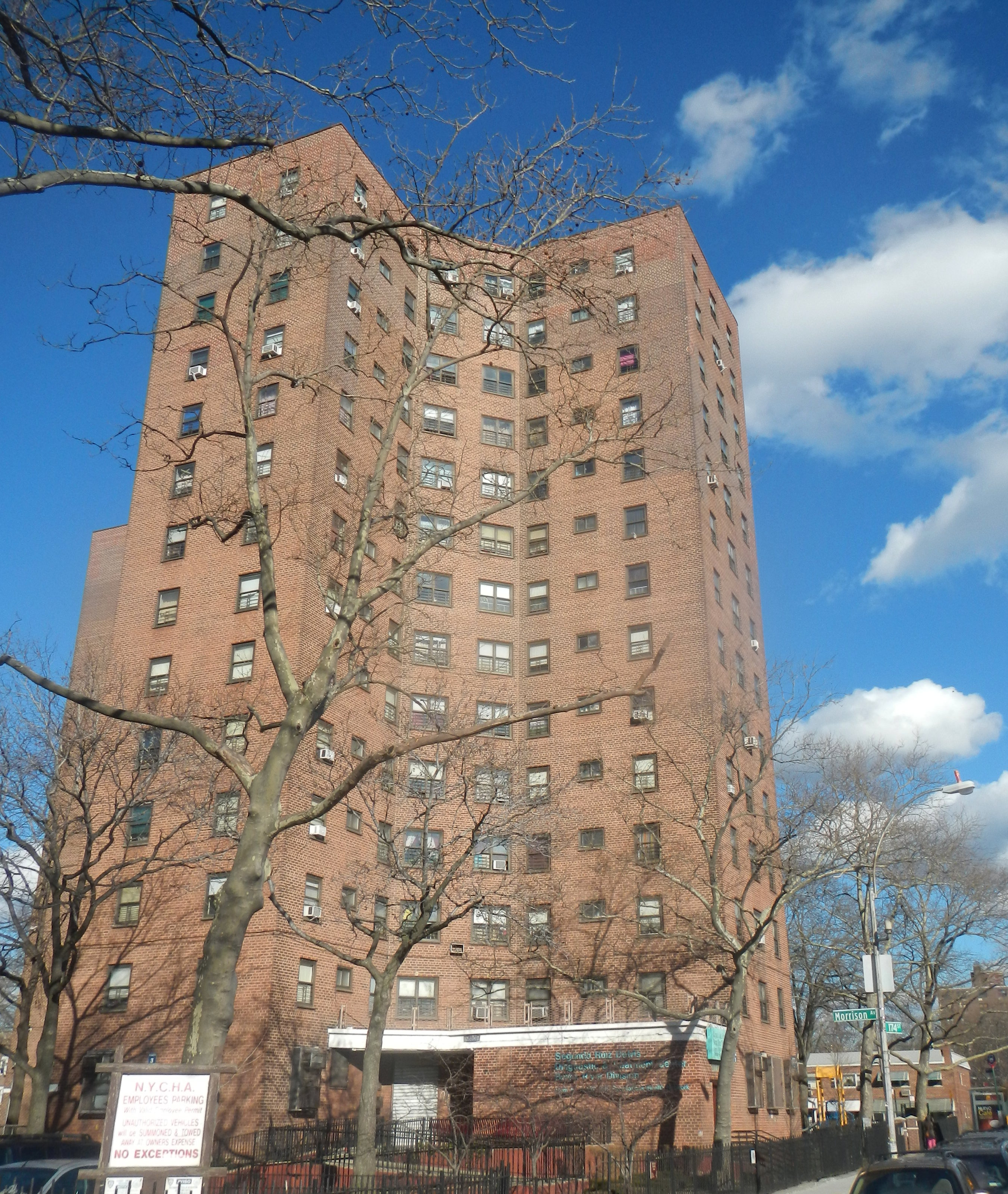
Bronx River Houses, Soundview, Bronx

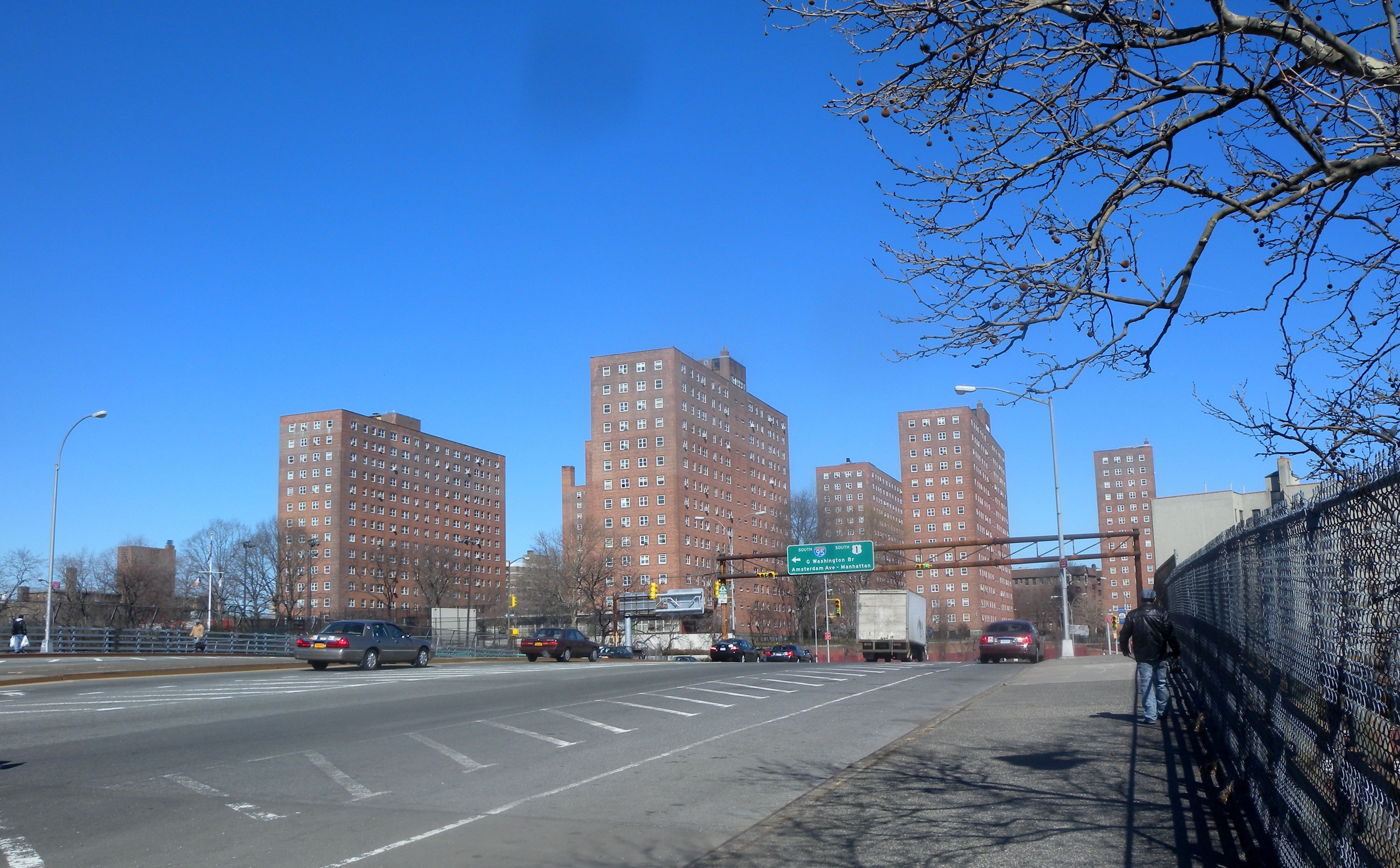
Sedgwick Houses, Morris Heights

NYCHA Property	Neighborhood/Subsection	No.# of Buildings	No.# of Stories	No.# of Apartments	Date of Completion	Date of Demolition	Notes
1010 East 178th Street	West Farms	1	21	218	March 31, 1971		
1162-1176 Washington Avenue	Morrisania	1	6	64	December 31, 1975		
1168 Stratford Avenue Rehab	Soundview	1	5	45	July 1, 1988		Disposed
1471 Watson Avenue	Soundview	1	6	96	December 31, 1970		
434 East 141st Street	Mott Haven	1	5	15	June 30, 1975		Disposed
Adams Houses	Melrose	7	15 and 21	925	August 31, 1964		
Bailey Avenue-West 193rd Street	University Heights	1	20	232	May 31, 1973		
Baychester Houses	Edenwald	11	6	441	May 31, 1963		
Dr. Ramon E. Betances I	Mott Haven	13	3, 4, 11 and 19	308	May 31, 1973		
Dr. Ramon E. Betances II, 13	Mott Haven	1	6	51	July 31, 1973		
Dr. Ramon E. Betances II, 18	Mott Haven	2	4 and 6	51	July 31, 1973		
Dr. Ramon E. Betances II, 9A	Mott Haven	1	4	46	July 31, 1973		
Dr. Ramon E. Betances III, 13	Mott Haven	2	5	22	July 31, 1973		
Dr. Ramon E. Betances III, 18	Mott Haven	1	5	19	July 31, 1973		
Dr. Ramon E. Betances III, 9A	Mott Haven	2	6	26	July 31, 1973		
Dr. Ramon E. Betances IV	Mott Haven	8	3, 4 and 5	282	December 31, 1973		
Dr. Ramon E. Betances V	Mott Haven	9	5 and 6	152	February 28, 1974		
Dr. Ramon E. Betances VI	Mott Haven	3	5 and 6	155	September 30, 1982		
Baychester Houses	Edenwald	11	6	441	May 31, 1963		
Boston Road Plaza Houses	Bronxdale	1	20	230	August 31, 1972		
Boston Secor Houses	Eastchester	4	13, 14, 17 and 18	538	April 30, 1969		
Boynton Avenue Rehabs	Soundview	3	4	20	1928		
Bronx River Addition	Soundview	2	6 and 14	225	February 28, 1966		
Bronx River Houses	Soundview	9	14	1,260	February 28, 1951		
Bronxchester Houses	Melrose	1	18	208	June 30, 1978		
Bryant Avenue-East 174th Street	Crotona Park East	1	6	111	August 31, 1972		
Butler Houses	Morrisania	6	21	1,476	December 31, 1964		
Castle Hill Houses	Castle Hill	14	12 and 20	2,025	November 30, 1960		
Claremont Parkway-Franklin Avenue Area	Morrisania	3	3 and 7	1,888	December 31, 1986		
Claremont Rehab (Group 2)	Concourse	6	5 and 6	107	April 30, 1987		
Claremont Rehab (Group 3)	Concourse	5	5	112	December 31, 1984		
Claremont Rehab (Group 4)	Concourse	9	4 and 5	150	October 31, 1986		
Claremont Rehab (Group 5)	Concourse	3	5	132	November 30, 1985		
Clason Point Gardens	Soundview	45	2	433	December 20, 1941		Oldest public housing development in the borough.
College Avenue-East 165th Street	Concourse	1	6	95	July 31, 1972		
Davidson Houses	Morrisania	1	8	177	August 31, 1973		
Eagle Avenue-East 165th Street	Morrisania	1	6	66	May 31, 1971		
East 152nd Street-Courtlandt Avenue	Melrose	2	11 and 14	221	1973		
East 165th Street-Bryant Avenue	Longwood	5	3	111	1987		
East 173rd Street-Vyse Avenue	East Morrisania	7	3	168	1995		
East 180th Street-Monterey Avenue	East Tremont	1	10	239	September 30, 1973		
Eastchester Gardens	Eastchester	10	7 and 8	874	June 1, 1950		
Edenwald Houses	Edenwald	40	3 and 14	2,034	October 15, 1953		Largest public housing development in the borough.
Forest Houses	Morrisania	15	9, 10 and 14	1,349	December 31, 1956		
Fort Independence Street-Heath Avenue	Kingsbridge Heights	1	21	344	November 30, 1974		
Franklin Avenue I (Conventional)	Morrisania	3	5	61	1986		
Franklin Avenue I M.H.O.P. (Multi Family Homeownership Program)	Morrisania	2	5		1986		Disposed
Franklin Avenue II (Conventional)	Morrisania	3	5	45	1986		
Franklin Avenue III (Conventional)	Morrisania	1	5	15	1986		
Franklin Avenue III M.H.O.P. (Multi Family Homeownership Program)	Morrisania	3	5		1986		
Glebe Avenue-Westchester Avenue	Westchester Square	1	6	132	December 31, 1971		
Gun Hill Houses	Williamsbridge	6	13, 14 and 15	733	November 30, 1950		
Harrison Avenue Rehab (Group A)	Morris Heights	1	5	34	1926		
Harrison Avenue Rehab (Group B)	Morris Heights	4	4 and 5	150	1926		
Highbridge Gardens	Highbridge	6	13 and 14	699	June 30, 1954		
Highbridge Rehabs (West 166th Street-Anderson Avenue)	Highbridge						
Highbridge Rehabs (Nelson Avenue)	Highbridge						
Hoe Avenue-East 173rd Street	East Morrisania	1	6				
Jackson Houses	Melrose	7	16	867	July 31, 1963		
Jennings Street M.H.O.P. (Multi Family Homeownership Program)	Morrisania	3	5	22	January 31, 1994		Disposed
Longfellow Avenue Rehab	Longwood	2	5	75	June 30, 1990		
Macombs Road	Morris Heights	2	5 and 6	7	December 31, 1986		Disposed
Marble Hill Houses	Marble Hill	11	14 and 15	1,682	March 3, 1952		
McKinley Houses	Morrisania	5	16	1,633	July 31, 1962		
Melrose Houses	Melrose	8	14	1,020	March 3, 1952		
Middleton Plaza	Pelham Bay	1	15	178	August 31, 1973		
Mill Brook Houses	Mott Haven	9	16 and 17	1,255	May 31, 1959		
Mill Brook Extension	Mott Haven	1	16	125	January 31, 1962		
Mitchell Houses	Mott Haven	10	17, 19 and 20	1,729	February 28, 1966		
Monroe Houses	Soundview	12	8, 14 and 15	1,102	September 30, 1961		
Moore Houses	Mott Haven	2	20	463	March 31, 1964		
Morris Heights Rehab	Morris Heights	3	5 and 6	1	April 1, 1986		Disposed
Morris I	Morrisania	10	16 and 20	1,084	August 31, 1965		
Morris II	Morrisania	7	16, 17 and 20	801	August 31, 1965		
Morrisania Air Rights	Melrose	3	19, 23 and 29	843	February 29, 1980		
Morrisania Houses	Morrisania	2	16 and 17	205	May 31, 1963		
Mott Haven Houses	Mott Haven	8	20 and 22	993	March 31, 1965		
Murphy Houses	East Morrisania	2	20	281	March 31, 1964		
Parkside Houses	Allerton	14	6, 7, 14 and 15	879	June 12, 1951		
Patterson Houses	Mott Haven	15	6 and 13	1,788	December 31, 1950		
Pelham Parkway Houses	Pelham Parkway	23	6	1,266	June 30, 1950		
Prospect Avenue M.H.O.P. (Multi Family Homeownership Program)	Morrisania	1	5	30	August 31, 1993		Disposed
PSS Grandparent Family Apartments	Morrisania	1	6	50	2005		
Randall-Balcom Houses	Throgs Neck	3	6	230	1971		
Sack Wern Houses	Soundview	7	6	410	May 12, 1977		
Saint Mary's Park Houses	Melrose	6	21	1,007	April 30, 1959		
Sedgwick Houses	Morris Heights	7	14 and 15	784	March 23, 1951		
Sotomayor Houses	Soundview	28	7	1,496	January 31, 1955		Originally known as Bronxdale Houses.
Soundview Houses	Soundview	13	7	1,255	December 31, 1954		
South Bronx Area (Site 402)	Melrose	4	3	114	May 1, 1988		
Southern Boulevard M.H.O.P. (Multi Family Homeownership Program)	Mott Haven	1	5	84	August 31, 1994		Disposed
Stebbins Avenue-Hewitt Place	Longwood	2	3	120	April 17, 1987		
Teller Avenue-East 166th Street	Concourse	1	6	91	1972		
Throggs Neck Addition	Throgs Neck	4	8 and 11	287	September 30, 1971		
Throggs Neck Houses	Throgs Neck	29	3 and 7	1,185	November 30, 1953		
Twin Park East (Site 9) Houses	East Tremont	1	14	219	November 30, 1981		
Twin Park West (Site 1 and 2) Houses	Tremont	1	16	312	September 30, 1974		
Union Avenue-East 163rd Street	Morrisania	1	9	200	March 11, 1985		
Union Avenue-East 166th Street	Morrisania	6	3	120	September 1, 1988		
University Avenue Rehab	Morris Heights	4	6	230	January 31, 1985		
Webster Houses	Morrisania	5	21	605	September 30, 1965		
West Farms Square Rehab	East Morrisania	4	6		May 1973 or October 31, 1974		
West Farms Square (Conventional)	East Morrisania	1	5	526	May 1973 or October 31, 1974		
West Farms Square M.H.O.P. (Multi Family Homeownership Program)	East Morrisania	2	5 and 6		June 30, 1994		Disposed
West Tremont Avenue-Sedgwick Avenue Area	Morris Heights	1	12	148	July 31, 1973		
West Tremont Rehab (Group 1)	Morris Heights	2	5 and 6	97	September 30, 1983		Disposed
West Tremont Rehab (Group 2)	Morris Heights	2	6	99	November 1, 1989		Disposed
West Tremont Rehab (Group 3)	Morris Heights	3	5	88	November 1, 1989		Disposed

=== Brooklyn ===
NYCHA Developments in Brooklyn
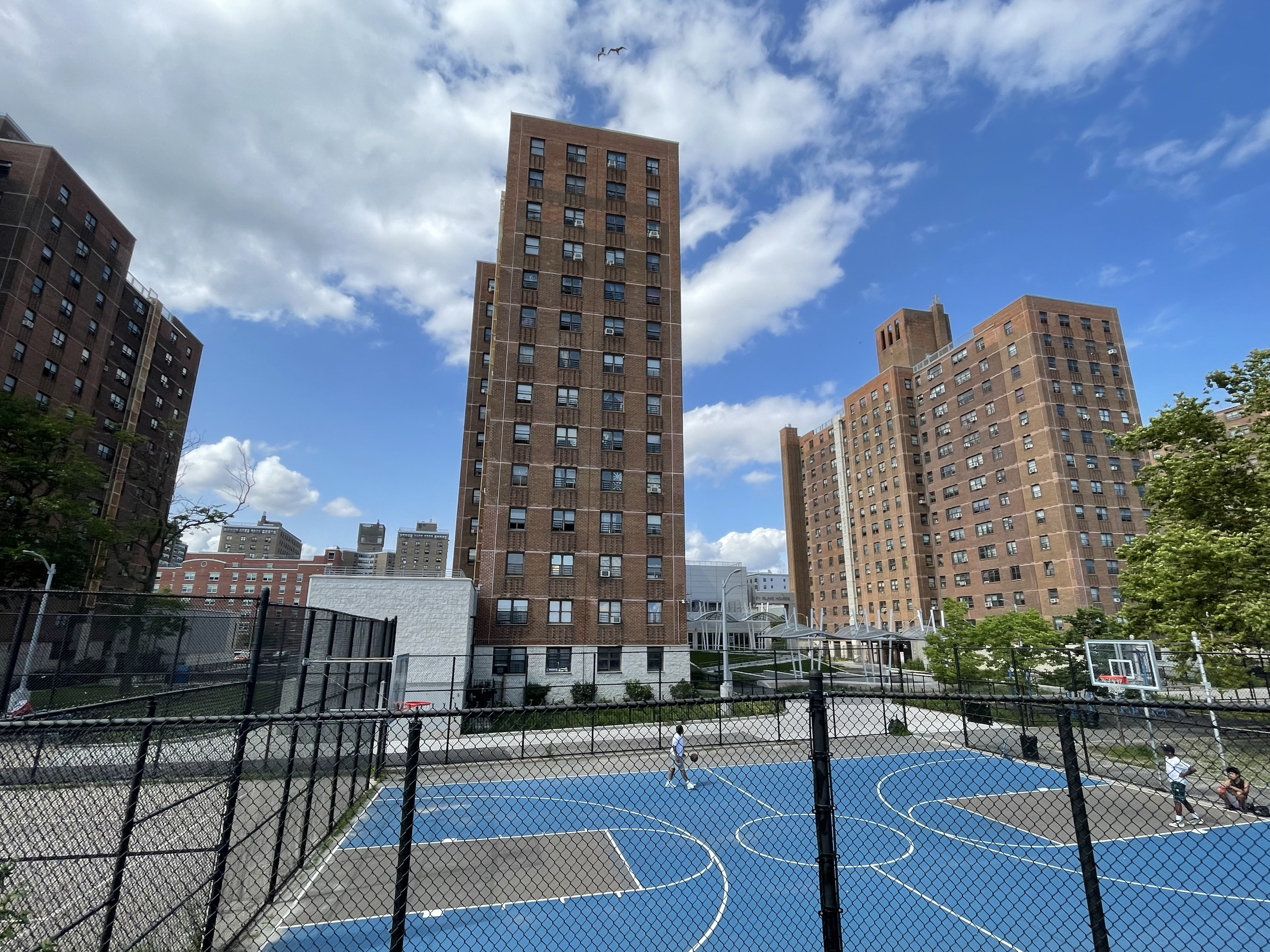
Coney Island Houses, Coney Island

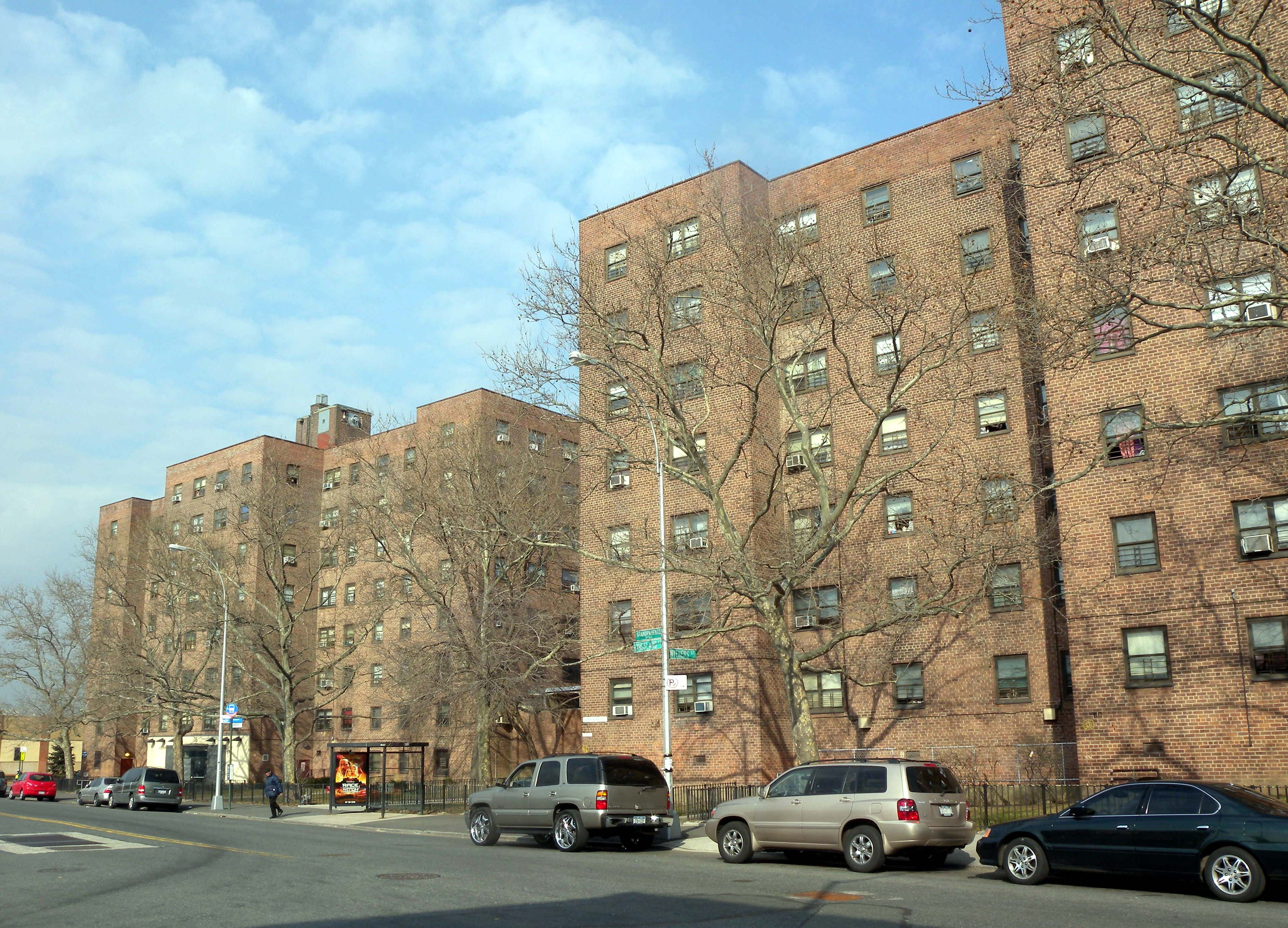
Cooper Park Houses, East Williamsburg

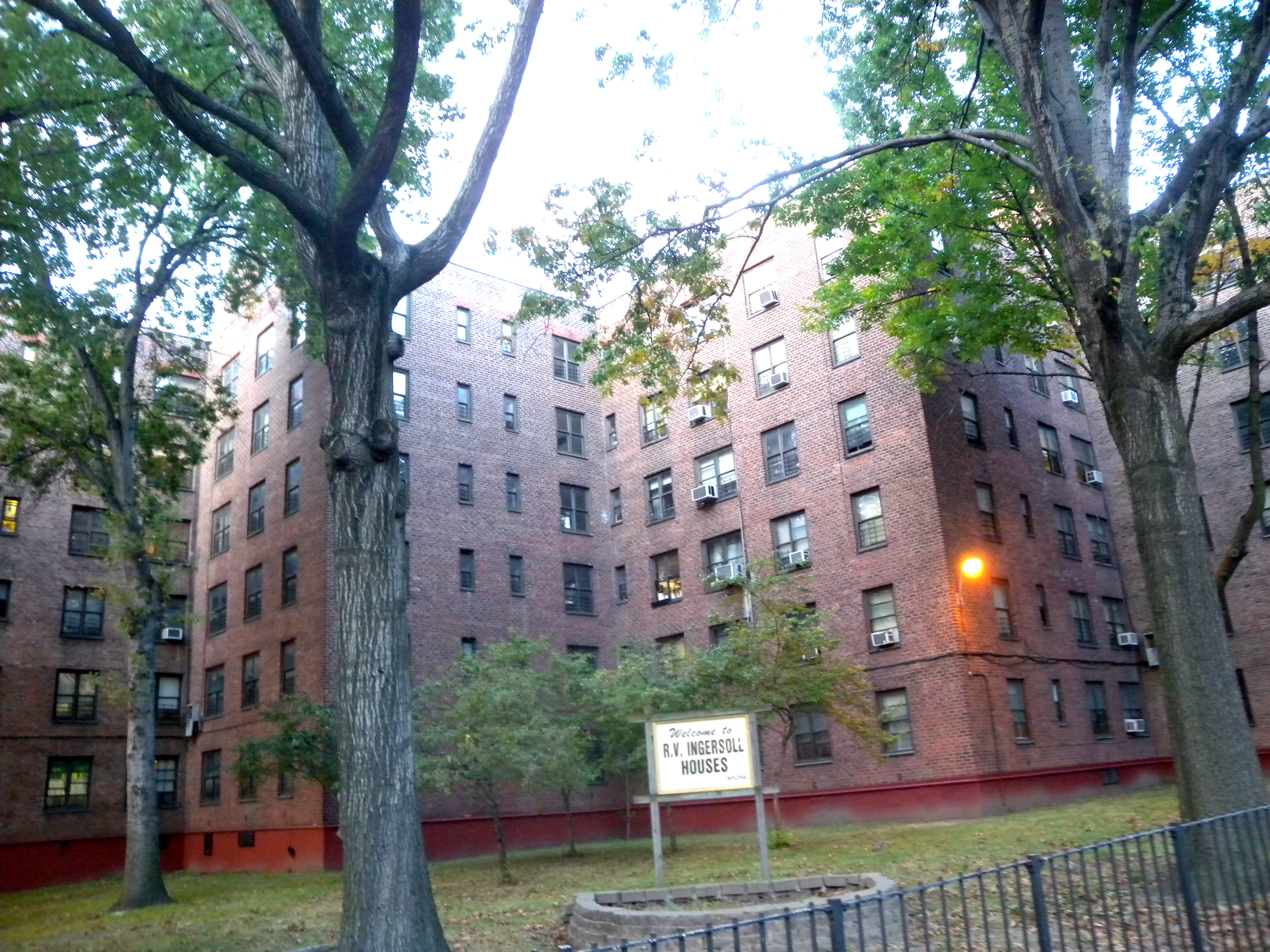
Ingersoll Houses, Fort Greene

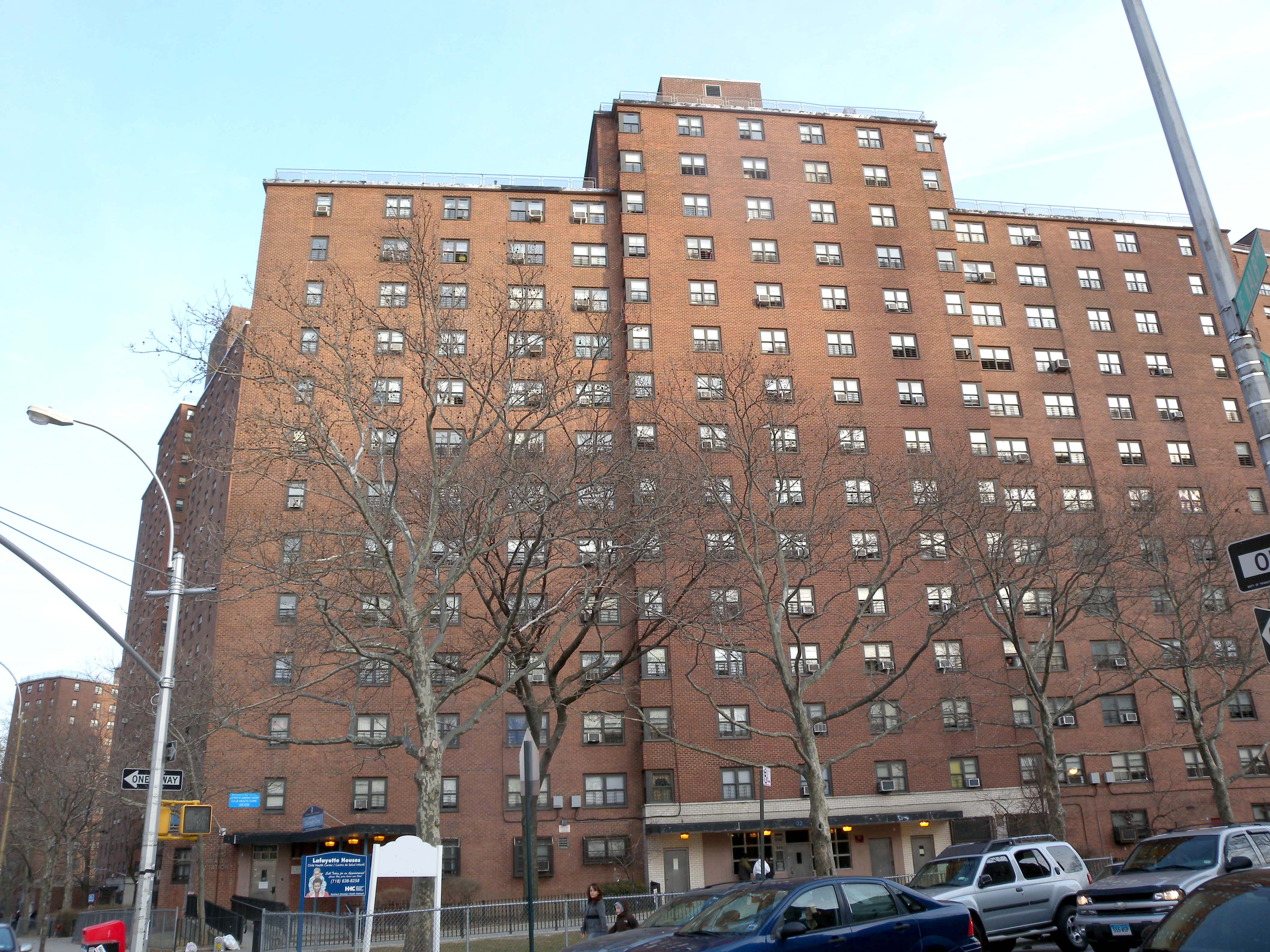
Lafayette Houses, Clinton Hill

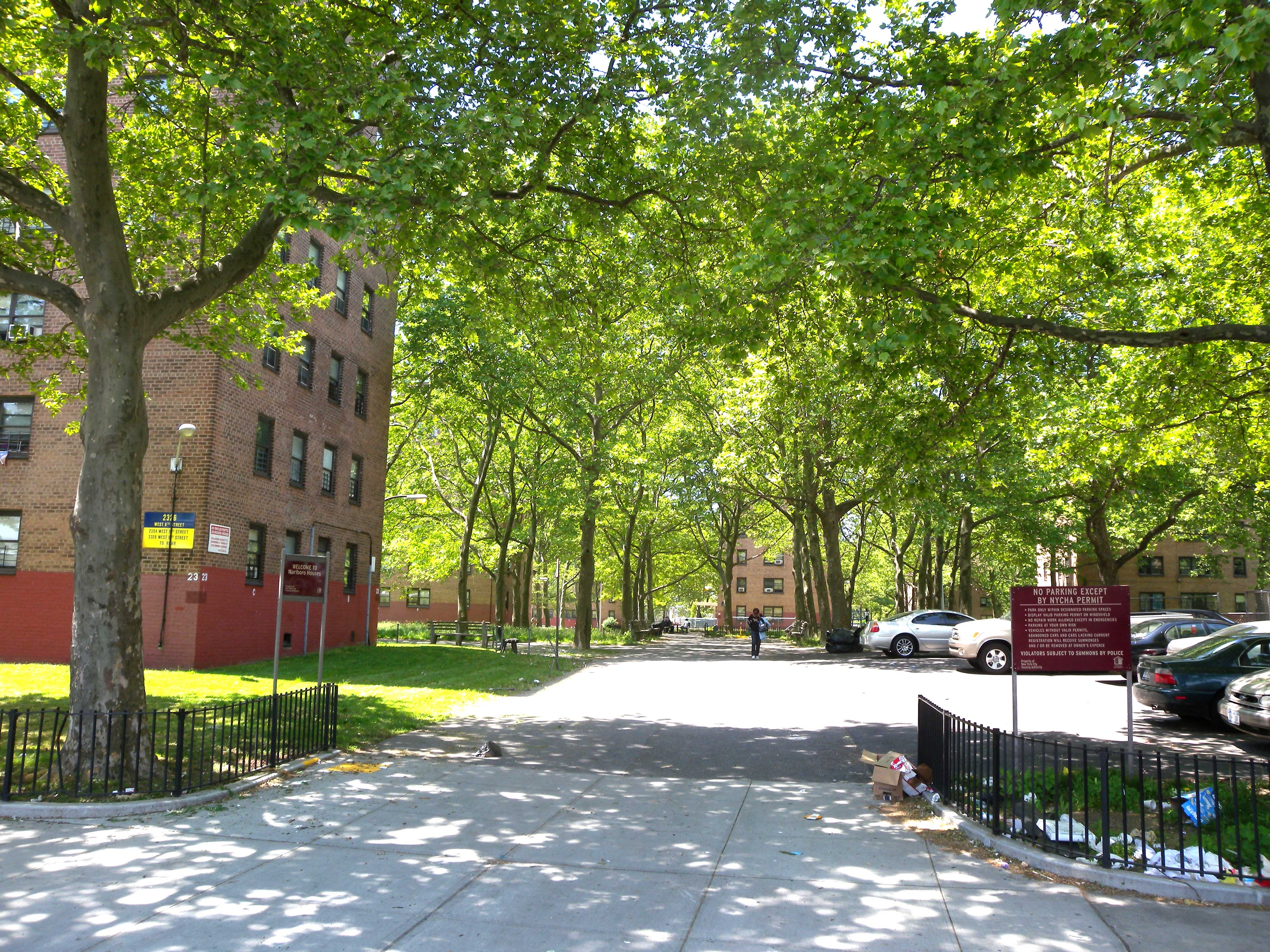
Marlboro Houses, Gravesend

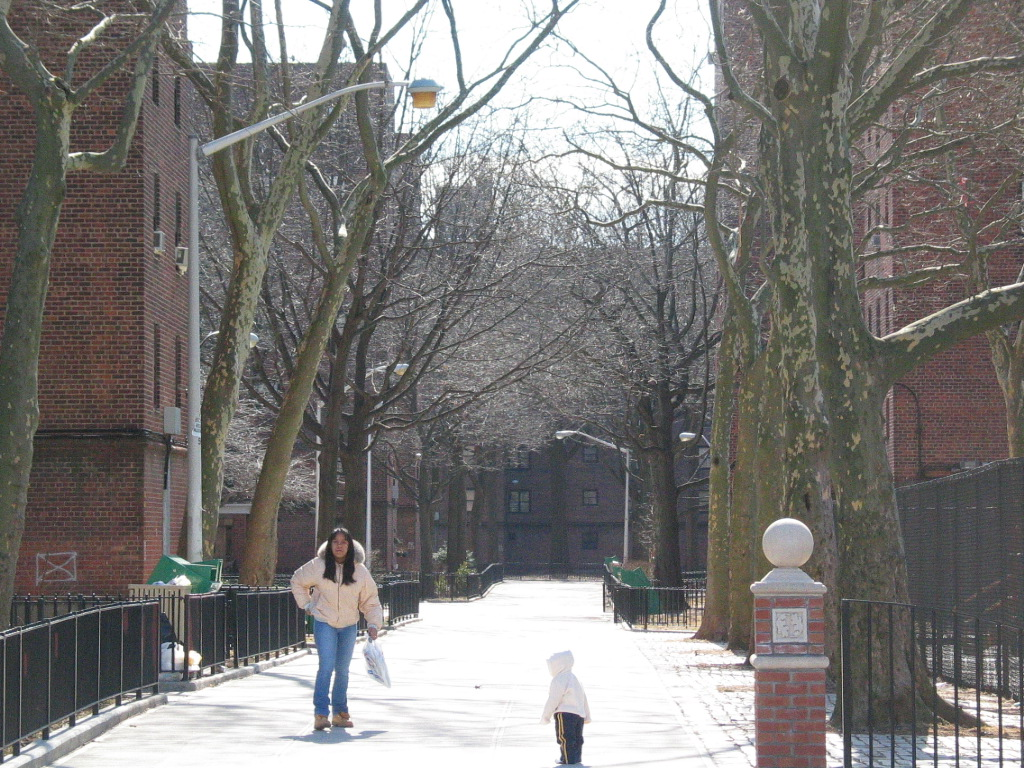
Sheepshead Houses, Sheepshead Bay

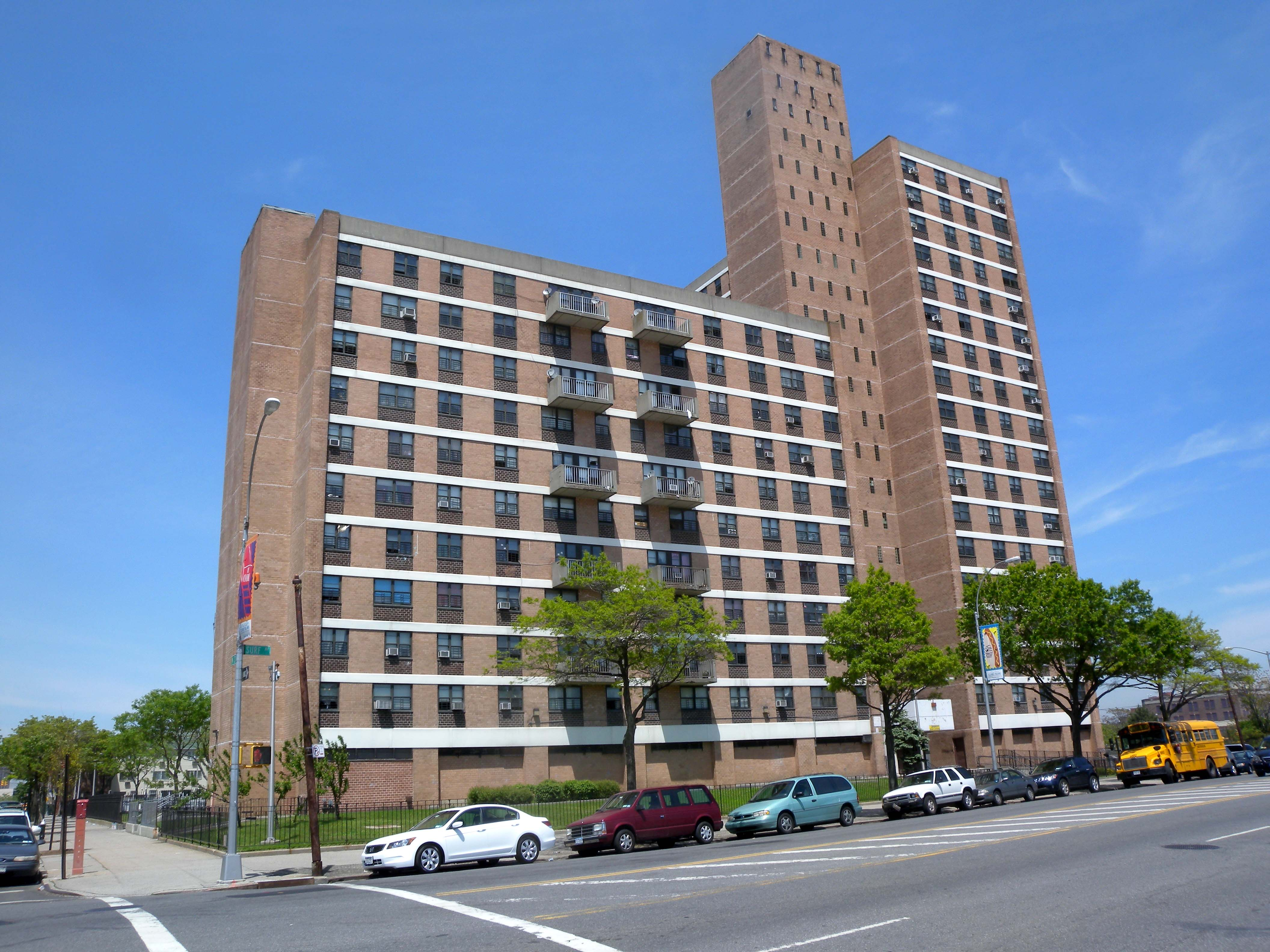
Unity Tower, Coney Island

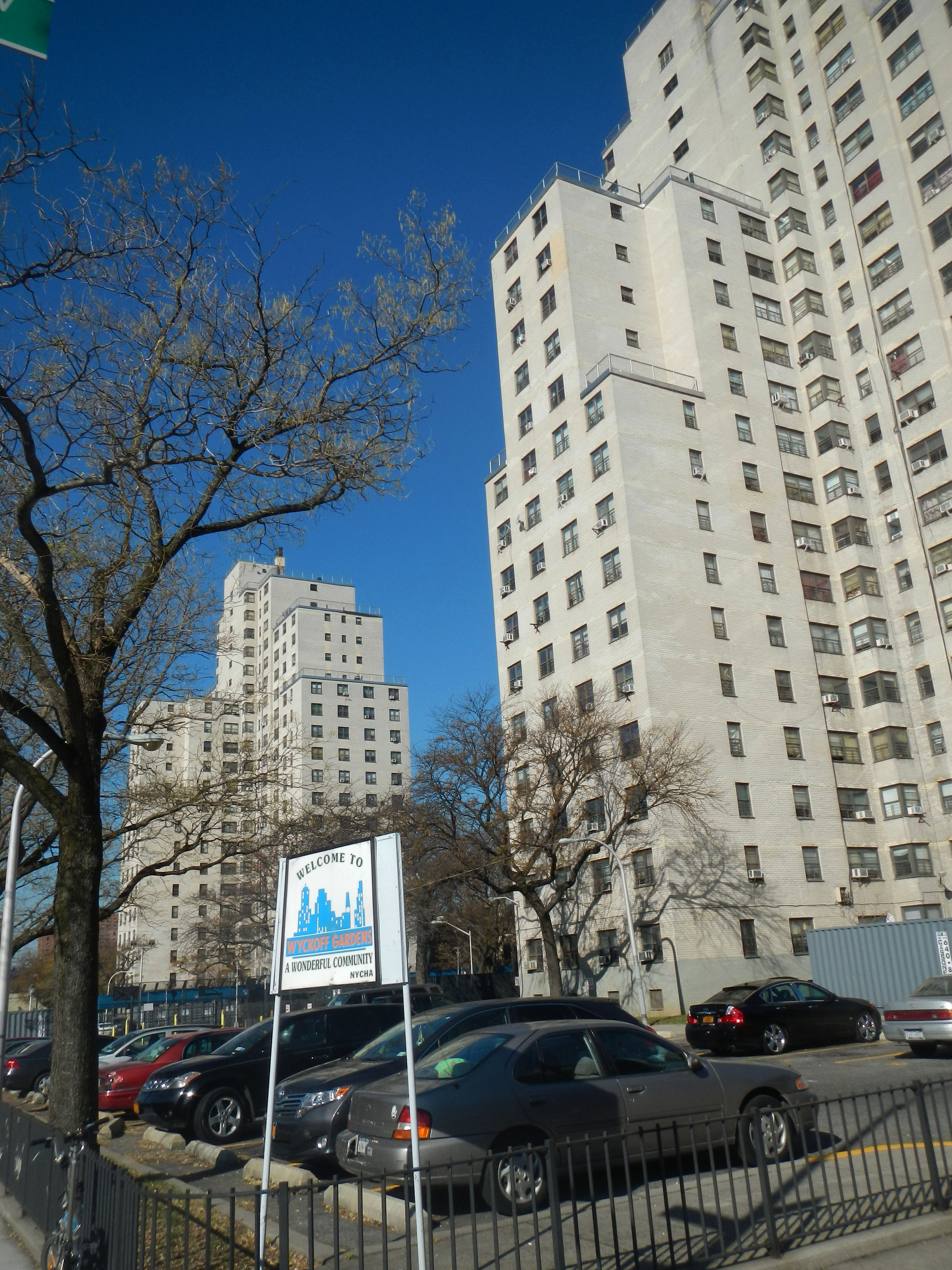
Wyckoff Gardens, Boerum Hill

Vanderveer Estates Apartments nka Flatbush Gardens, Tiffany Towers nka Tivoli Towers, Ebbets Field Apartments and Towers of Bay Ridge and Rutland Rd Houses in Brooklyn,. Even though all five take Section 8, because they include rent, gas & electric (including AC) in the lease, they are not considered projects or developments owned by NYCHA.

NYCHA Property	Neighborhood/Subsection	No.# of Buildings	No.# of Stories	No.# of Apartments	Date of Completion	Date of Demolition	Notes
104-14 Tapscott Street	Brownsville	1	4	30	October 31, 1972		
303 Vernon Avenue	Bedford-Stuyvesant	1	24	234	May 31, 1967		
572 Warren Street	Boerum Hill	1	6	200	1971		
Albany Houses I	Crown Heights	6	14	824	October 2, 1950		
Albany Houses II	Crown Heights	3	13 and 14	396	January 31, 1957		
Armstrong Houses I	Bedford-Stuyvesant	11	4 and 6	369	May 31, 1973		
Armstrong Houses II	Bedford-Stuyvesant	5	5	248	October 31, 1974		
Atlantic Terminal Site 4B	Fort Greene	1	31	300	April 30, 1976		The tallest residential property owned by NYCHA, reaching 31 stories.
Bay View Houses	Canarsie	23	8	1,610	May 31, 1956		
Bedford-Stuyvesent Rehab	Bedford–Stuyvesant	3	4 and 6	84	May 31, 1983		
Belmont-Sutter Area	East New York	3	3	72	February 28, 1986		
Bernard Haber Houses	Coney Island	3	14	380	June 30, 1965		
Berry Street-South 9th Street	Williamsburg	4	3 and 6	148	September 30, 1995		
Borinquen Plaza I	Williamsburg	8	7	509	February 28, 1975		
Borinquen Plaza II	Williamsburg	7	7	425	December 31, 1975		
Boulevard Houses	East New York	18	6 and 14	1,436	March 22, 1951		Tallest six 14 story multi residential property from 1951-1960.
Breukelen Houses	Canarsie	30	3 and 7	1,595	October 31, 1952		
Brevoort Houses	Bedford-Stuyvesant	13	7	894	August 31, 1955		
Brown Houses	Ocean Hill	2	6	200	July 31, 1985		
Brownsville Houses	Brownsville	27	6	1,319	April 16, 1948		
Bushwick-Hylan Houses	Williamsburg	8	13 and 20	1,221	March 31, 1960		
Bushwick II (Groups A & C)	Bushwick	25	3	300	July 19, 1984		
Bushwick II (Groups B & D)	Bushwick	25	3	300	July 5, 1984		
Bushwick II & Bushwick CDA	Bushwick	5	3	276	December 10, 1986		
Carey Gardens	Coney Island	3	15 and 17	683	November 30, 1970		
Crown Heights Houses	Crown Heights	8	4	121	1956		
Coney Island Houses	Coney Island	5	14	535	January 31, 1957		
Coney Island (Site 1B) Houses	Coney Island	1	18	193	May 31, 1973		
Coney Island (Site 8) Houses	Coney Island	1	14	123	December 31, 1973		
Coney Island (Sites 4 & 5) Houses	Coney Island	1	17	373	July 31, 1974		
Cooper Park Houses	East Williamsburg	11	7	699	June 8, 1953		
Cypress Hills Houses	East New York	15	7	1,442	May 31, 1955		
East New York City Line Houses	East New York	33	3	63	March 31, 1976		
Farragut Houses	Downtown Brooklyn	10	13 and 14	1,390	April 30, 1952		
Fenimore-Lefferts Houses	East Flatbush	18	2	36	September 30, 1969		
Fiorentino Plaza	East New York	8	4	160	October 31, 1971		
Glenmore Plaza	Brownsville	4	10, 18, and 24	438	April 30, 1968		
Glenwood Houses	Flatlands	20	6	1,187	July 14, 1950		
Gowanus Houses	Gowanus	14	4, 6, 9, 13, and 14	1,134	June 14, 1949		
Gravesend Houses	Coney Island	15	7	634	June 30, 1954		
Hope Gardens	Bushwick	4	7 and 14	324	August 31, 1981		Hosts Left Hook NYC in its community center
Howard Houses	Brownsville	10	7 and 13	814	December 31, 1955		
Howard Av. Houses	Crown Heights	8	3 and 5	148	1992		
Howard Av.-Park Place	Crown Heights	8	3	155	August 31, 1994		
Independence Towers	Williamsburg	6	21	744	October 31, 1965		
Ingersoll Houses	Fort Greene	20	6 and 11	1,802	February 24, 1944		
Jonathan Williams Plaza	Williamsburg	5	14 and 21	577	April 15, 1964		
Kingsborough Houses-Kingsborough Extension	Crown Heights	16	6	1,148	October 31, 1941		
Lafayette Gardens	Clinton Hill	7	13, 15 and 20	880	July 31, 1962		
Langston Hughes Apartments	Brownsville	3	22	508	June 30, 1968		
Lenox Road-Rockaway Parkway	Brownsville	3	4	74	May 31, 1985		
Linden Houses	East New York	19	8 and 14	1,586	June 30, 1958		
Long Island Baptist Houses	East New York	4	6	233	June 30, 1981		
Louis Heaton Pink Houses	East New York	22	8	1,500	September 30, 1959		
Low Income Housing Demonstration Grant	East New York	9	3	16	February 29, 1968		Disposed
Marcus Garvey Houses	Brownsville	3	6 and 14	321	February 28, 1975		
Marcy Houses	Bedford-Stuyvesant	27	6	1,705	January 19, 1949		
Marcy-Greene Avs. Houses (Sites A-B)	Bedford-Stuyvesant	3	3	78	June 30, 1997		
Marlboro Houses	Gravesend	28	7 and 16	1,765	January 31, 1958		
Nostrand Houses	Marine Park	16	6	1,148	December 14, 1950		
O'Dwyer Gardens Houses	Coney Island	6	15 and 16	573	December 31, 1969		
Ocean Hill Apartments	Ocean Hill	3	14	238	March 31, 1968		
Ocean Hill-Brownsville	Ocean Hill-Brownsville	5	14	238	1959		
Palmetto Gardens	Bushwick	1	6	115	March 31, 1977		
Penn. Av. Rehab.	East New York						
Penn.-Wortman Avs. Houses	East New York	3	14	336	September 30, 1972		
Park Rock Rehab.	Crown Heights	9	4	134	September 1, 1986		
Prospect Plaza	Ocean Hill	4	12 and 15	368	June 30, 1974	Summer of 2014	First NYCHA development to be demolished
Quincy-Greene Houses	Bedford–Stuyvesant	3	3 and 4	40			Disposed
Ralph Av. Rehab	Brownsville	5	4	118	September 30, 1972		
Red Hook East Houses	Red Hook	27	2 and 6	2,528	November 20, 1939		
Red Hook West Houses	Red Hook	3	3 and 14	345	May 31, 1955		the location of the 1991 film, Straight Out of Brooklyn
Roosevelt Houses	Bedford-Stuyvesant	6	14, 15 and 18	762	September 30, 1964		
Roosevelt II	Bedford-Stuyvesant	3	14 and 15	342	December 31, 1966		
Rutland Towers	East Flatbush	1	6	61	May 31, 1977		
Saratoga Square	Bedford-Stuyvesant	2	12 and 13	251	November 30, 1980		
Seth Low Houses	Brownsville	4	17 and 18	536	December 31, 1967		
Sheepshead Bay Houses	Sheepshead Bay	18	6	1,056	August 8, 1950		
Sterling Pl. Rehabs	Crown Heights	5	4	83	January 31, 1991		
Sumner Houses	Bedford-Stuyvesant	13	7 and 12	1,098	April 30, 1958		
Stuyvesant Gardens I	Bedford-Stuyvesant	5	4	330	August 31, 1972		
Stuyvesant Gardens II	Bedford-Stuyvesant	1	7	150	February 28, 1986		
Sutter Avenue-Union Street Houses	Brownsville	3	4 and 6	125	May 11, 1991		
Surfside Gardens	Coney Island	5	14 and 15	597	June 30, 1969		
Tapscott St. Rehab	Brownsville	8	4	155	January 31, 1986		
Tilden Houses	Brownsville	8	16	998	June 30, 1961		
Tompkins Houses	Bedford-Stuyvesant	8	8 and 16	1,048	July 31, 1964		
Taylor/Wythe Houses	Williamsburg	5	8, 11, 12 and 13	525	June 30, 1974		
Unity Plaza (Sites 17, 24, 25A)	East New York	3	6	167	November 30, 1973		
Unity Plaza (Sites 4-27)	East New York	5	6	460	September 30, 1973		
Van Dyke Houses	Brownsville	22	3 and 14	1,602	May 27, 1955		the location of the 2010 film, Brooklyn's Finest
Van Dyke II	Brownsville	1	14	111	April 30, 1964		
Vandalia Av. Houses	East New York	2	10	289	May 31, 1983		
Walt Whitman Houses	Fort Greene	15	6 and 13	1,636	February 24, 1944		
Weeksville Gardens	Crown Heights	2	4 and 5	257	April 30, 1974		
William Reid Houses	East Flatbush	1	20	228	November 30, 1969		
Williamsburg Houses	Williamsburg	20	4	1,620	April 10, 1938		Oldest public housing development in the borough.
Woodson Houses	Brownsville	2	10 and 25	407	August 31, 1970		
Wyckoff Gardens	Boerum Hill	3	21	528	December 31, 1966		

=== Queens ===
NYCHA Developments in Queens
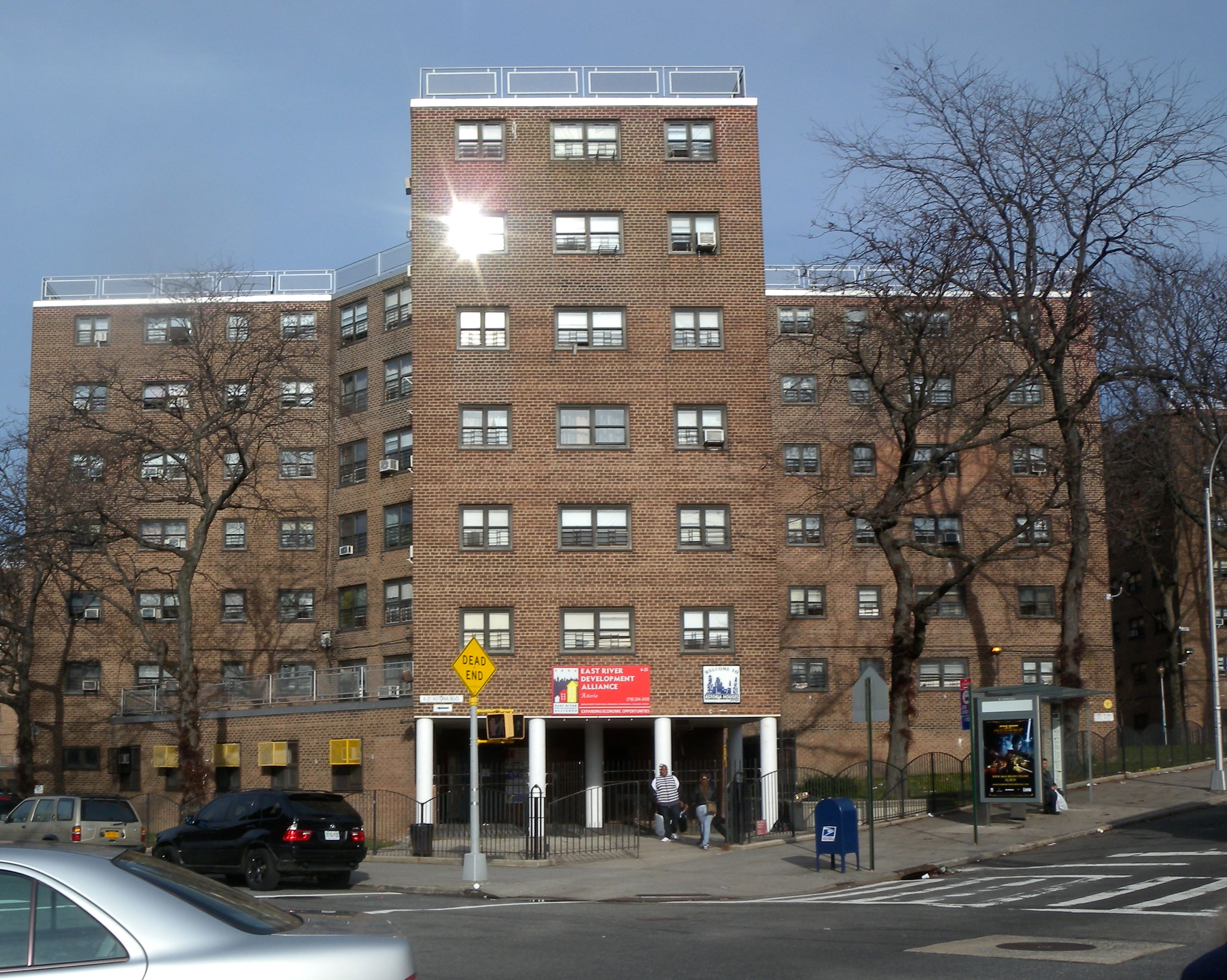
Astoria Houses, Astoria

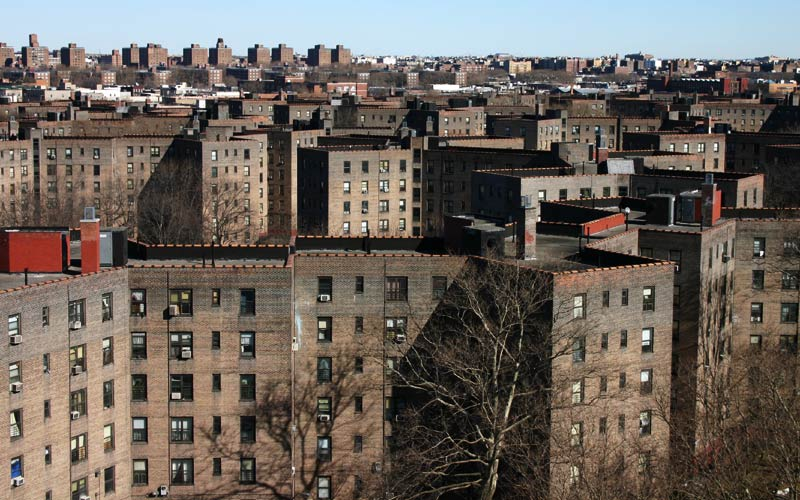
Queensbridge Houses, Long Island City

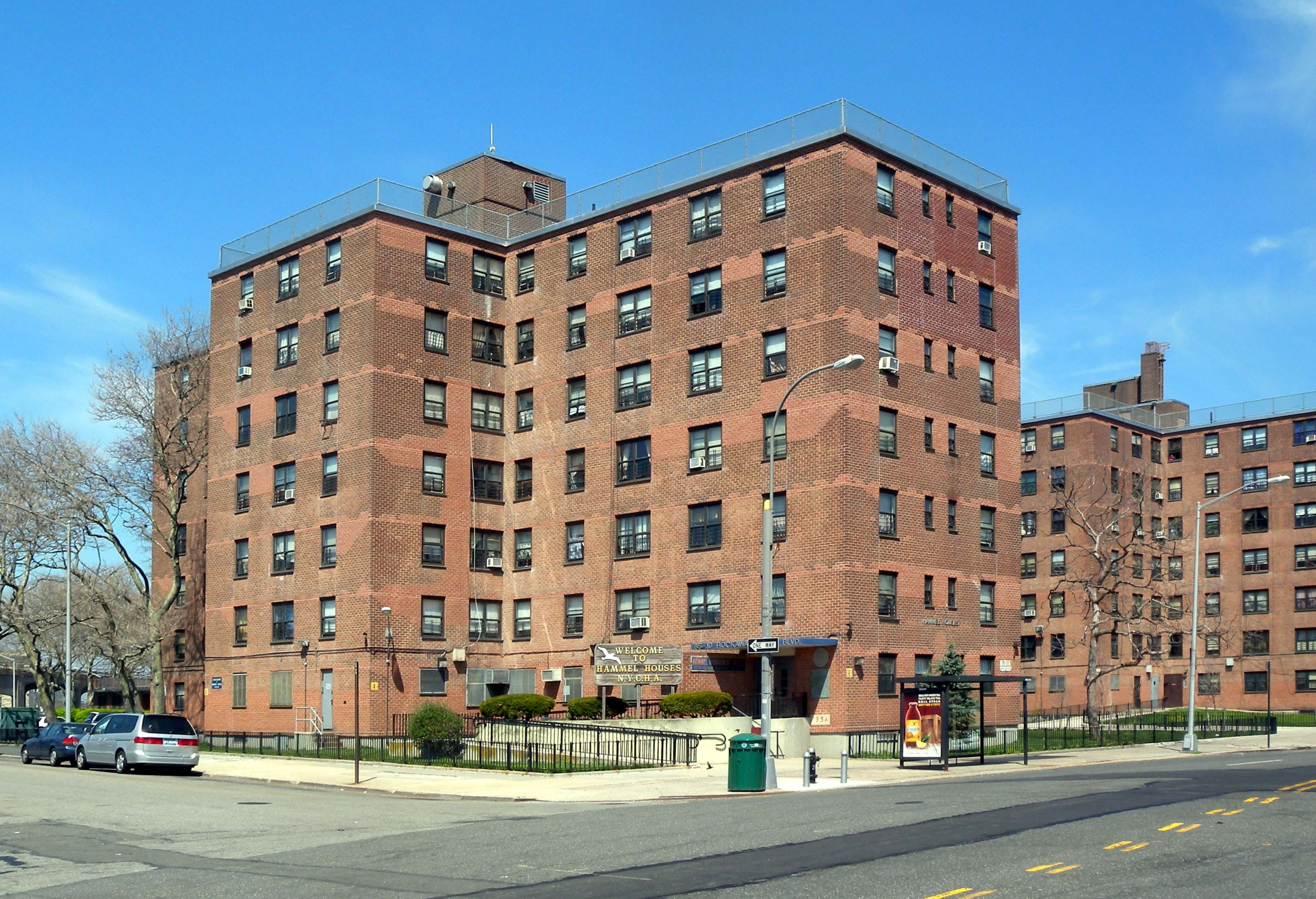
Hammel Houses, Hammels

NYCHA Property	Neighborhood/Subsection	No.# of Buildings	No.# of Stories	No.# of Apartments	Date of Completion	Date of Demolition	Notes
Astoria Houses	Astoria	22	6 and 7	1,102	November 9, 1951		
Baisley Park Houses	South Jamaica	5	8	385	April 30, 1961		
Beach 41st Street-Beach Channel Drive Houses	Far Rockaway	4	13	712	November 30, 1973		
Bland Houses	Flushing	5	10	400	April 30, 1952		
Carleton Manor	Arverne	1	11	170	March 31, 1967		
Conlon L.I.H.F.E. Towers	Jamaica	1	13	216	March 31, 1971		
Forest Hills Co-op Houses	Forest Hills	3	12	430	November 30, 1975		Left NYCHA in 2017 to become a tenant-managed co-op.
Hammel Houses	Rockaway Beach	14	6 and 7	712	April 30, 1955		
International Tower	South Jamaica	1	10	153	May 31, 1983		
Latimer Gardens	Flushing	4	10	434	September 30, 1970		
Leavitt House	Flushing	1	6	83	October 17, 1974		
Ocean Bay Apartments (Bayside)	Edgemere	24	7 and 9	1,378	September 25, 1961		formerly known as Edgemere Houses
Ocean Bay Apartments (Oceanside)	Edgemere	7	6	417	February 28, 1951		formerly known as Arverne Houses
Pomonok Houses	Flushing	35	3, 7 and 8	2,070	June 30, 1952		
Queensbridge Houses (North and South)	Long Island City	26	6	3,142	March 15, 1940		the largest public housing complex in the United States. The oldest Public Housing development in Queens
Ravenswood Houses	Long Island City	31	6 and 7	2,167	July 31, 1951		
Redfern Houses	Far Rockaway	9	6 and 7	604	August 28, 1959		
Rehab Program	College Point						
Shelton Houses	South Jamaica	1	12	155	October 31, 1978		
South Jamaica I Houses	South Jamaica	11	3 and 4	440	August 1, 1940		
South Jamaica II Houses	South Jamaica	16	3 and 7	600	October 25, 1954		
Woodside Houses	Woodside	20	6	1,358	December 30, 1949		

=== Staten Island ===
NYCHA Property	Neighborhood/Subsection	No.# of Buildings	No.# of Stories	No.# of Apartments	Date of Completion	Date of Demolition	Notes
Berry Houses	Dongan Hills	8	6	506	October 30, 1950		
Cassidy-Lafayette Houses	Randall Manor	4	6	381	September 30, 1971		
Mariners Harbor Houses	Mariners Harbor	22	3 and 6	605	August 31, 1954		Disposed
Markham Gardens	Randell Manor	30	2		June 30, 1943		
New Lane Shores Houses	Shore Acres	1	10	304	July 31, 1984		
Richmond Terrace Houses	New Brighton	6	8	489	October 12, 1964		
South Beach Houses	South Beach	8	6	422	March 20, 1950		
Stapleton Houses	Stapleton	6	8	693	May 31, 1962		Largest public housing development in the borough.
West Brighton Houses	West New Brighton	8	8	490	December 31, 1962		
West Brighton II	West New Brighton	8	1	144	December 31, 1965		
Todt Hill Houses	Manor Heights	7	6	502	June 1, 1950		

== Federal Housing Administration Reprocessed Developments ==
The list of all house groups that is a property of FHA.

FHA Reprocessed Development Property Group No.#	No.# of Buildings	No.# of Stories	No.# of Apartments	Date of Completion	Date of Demolition	Notes
1 (I)	20	1 and 2	23	October 31, 1969		
2 (II)	10	1, 2 and 3	11	September 30, 1970		
3 (III)	10	1 and 2	10	April 30, 1971		
4 (IV)	9	1, 2 and 3	9	June 30, 1971		
5 (V)	28	1, 2 and 3	32	July 31, 1976		
6 (VI)	6	1, 1.5, 2, and 2.5	7	July 31, 1976		
7 (VII)	5	1, 1.5, 2, and 2.5	5	July 31, 1976		
8 (VIII)	7	1, 1.5, 2, and 2.5	7	July 31, 1976		
9 (IX)	12	1, 1.5, 2, 2.5, and 3	27	June 30, 1982		
10 (X)	16	1, 1.5, 2, and 2.5	17	June 30, 1982		

== City Part IV Co-op Disposed Developments ==
Buildings built by NYCHA, though not currently owned or operated by the agency.

City Part IV Property	Neighborhood/Subsection	No.# of Buildings	No.# of Stories	No.# of Apartments	Date of Completion	Date of Demolition	Notes
Cedar Manor Houses	Jamaica	3	8	216	February 28, 1962		
Franklin Plaza	East Harlem	14	20	1,635	November 30, 1962		
Gouverneur Gardens	Lower East Side	6	21	782	November 30, 1964		
Luna Park Houses	Coney Island	5	20	1,576	January 31, 1967		
Marsaryk Towers	Lower East Side	4	21	1,109	July 31, 1967		
Rosedale Gardens	Soundview	4	15	408	February 28, 1962		
Village View Houses	East Village	7	16 and 21	1,236	December 31, 1964		
Woodstock Terrace	Morrisania	2	18	320	February 28, 1963		

== Statistics ==
- 335 developments in New York City
- Staten Island has 9 developments with 4,499 apartments
- Queens has 22 developments with 17,126 apartments
- The Bronx has 100 developments with 44,500 apartments
- Brooklyn has 98 developments with 58,669 apartments
- Manhattan has 102 developments with 53,890 apartments
- The Bronx's largest development is Edenwald Houses in Edenwald with 2,036 apartments.
- Brooklyn's largest development is Red Hook Houses in Red Hook with 2,878 apartments.
- Queens's largest development is Queensbridge Houses in Long Island City with 3,142 apartments
- Manhattan's largest development is Baruch Houses on the Lower East Side with 2,391 apartments
- Staten Island's largest development is Stapleton Houses in Stapleton with 693 apartments.
- 10 developments consisting of FHA Acquired Homes are located in more than one borough and total 200 apartments
- 42 developments are for seniors only; 15 seniors-only buildings exist within mixed-population developments
- NYCHA has approximately 9,822 apartments designated for seniors only
- There also are 7,639 retrofitted apartments for families of persons who are mobility impaired as of September 30, 2007
- As of April 13, 2017: 14 developments are at least 70 years old; a total of 60 developments are 60 to 69 years old; there are 75 developments 50 to 59 years old; another 89 developments are 40 to 49 years old, and 52 developments are 30 to 39 years old.
- The combined demographics of all public housing developments in New York City is about 46% Black, 44% Hispanic, 4% White, 5% Asian, and 1% other.
- NYCHA residents in Chelsea earn significantly less money than the average Chelsea resident and are almost half as likely to have a college degree.
- The Queensbridge Houses in Long Island City, Queens, is now North America's largest housing project with 3,142 apartments, following the demolition of several larger Chicago housing projects, including the Cabrini–Green Homes and the Robert Taylor Homes (whose 4,321 three, four and five bedroom apartments once made it the largest public housing project in the world).
- Brownsville, Brooklyn has the highest concentration of low income public housing in America.

== See also ==
- Public housing in the United States
- Mitchell-Lama Housing Program
- La Guardia and Wagner Archives
- Rent control in New York
- Developing Lives
- New York City Department of Housing Preservation and Development
- Project Lives
