= Taft Houses =

Public housing development in Manhattan, New York

- NYCHA Property
- Interactive map of Taft Houses
- Country: United States
- state: New York
- City: New York City
- Borough: Manhattan

Area
  - Total: 12.36 acres (5.00 ha)

Population
  - Total: 2,578
- Zip Code: 10029

The Taft Houses is a NYCHA housing project with 9 buildings containing 19 stories in each individual building. It is located between East 112th and 115th Streets and also between Park and 5th Avenues in East Harlem, Manhattan.

== History ==
Plans for the project were filed with the New York City Department of Buildings in August 1956. The housing complex was named after Robert A. Taft and was dedicated on October 20, 1961 in a ceremony attended by Prescott Bush, Jacob Javits, Newbold Morris, Robert Moses, Robert F. Wagner Jr. and alumni of the Yale Whiffenpoofs. This housing project was completed in December 1962.

=== 21st century ===
The city capital action plan in May 2021 approved that plan to replace many boilers for heating upgrades and was completed in March 9, 2022 for $28.6 million. The $9.8 part was used for this complex while the rest of the money was used for Walt Whitman Houses as part of PACT.

== See also ==
- New York City Housing Authority
