= Chelsea, Manhattan =

Neighborhood in New York City

Chelsea
- Neighborhood of Manhattan
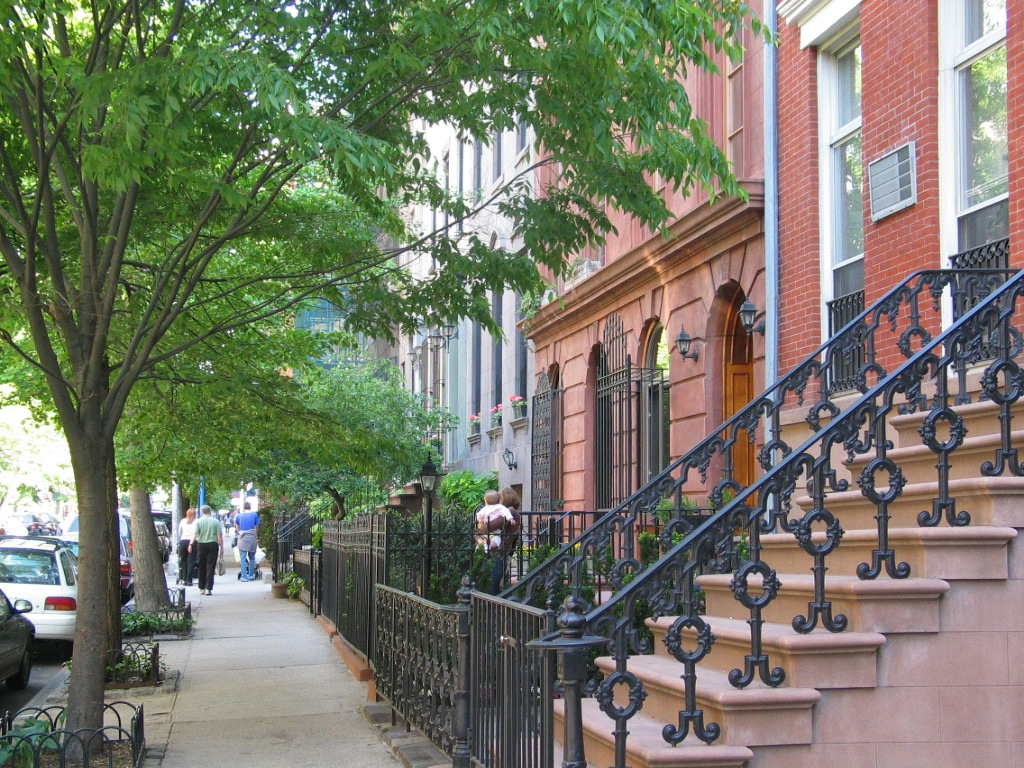
- A Chelsea streetscape
- Interactive map of Chelsea
- Coordinates: 40°44′47″N 74°00′05″W
- Country: United States
- State: New York
- City: New York City
- Borough: Manhattan
- Community District: Manhattan 4

Area
  - Total: 0.774 sq mi (2.00 km^{2})

Population (2020)
  - Total: 69,741
  - Density: 66,000/sq mi (25,000/km^{2})
- Neighborhood tabulation area; includes Hudson Yards

Ethnicity
  - White: 55.7%
  - Hispanic: 17.2
  - Asian: 15.0
  - Black: 6.9
  - Others: 5.1

Economics
  - Median income: $118,915
- Time zone: UTC−5 (Eastern)
  - Summer (DST): UTC−4 (EDT)
- ZIP Codes: 10001, 10011
- Area codes: 212, 332, 646, and 917
- Website
- Chelsea Historic District
- U.S. National Register of Historic Places
- U.S. Historic district
- New York State Register of Historic Places
- New York City Landmark
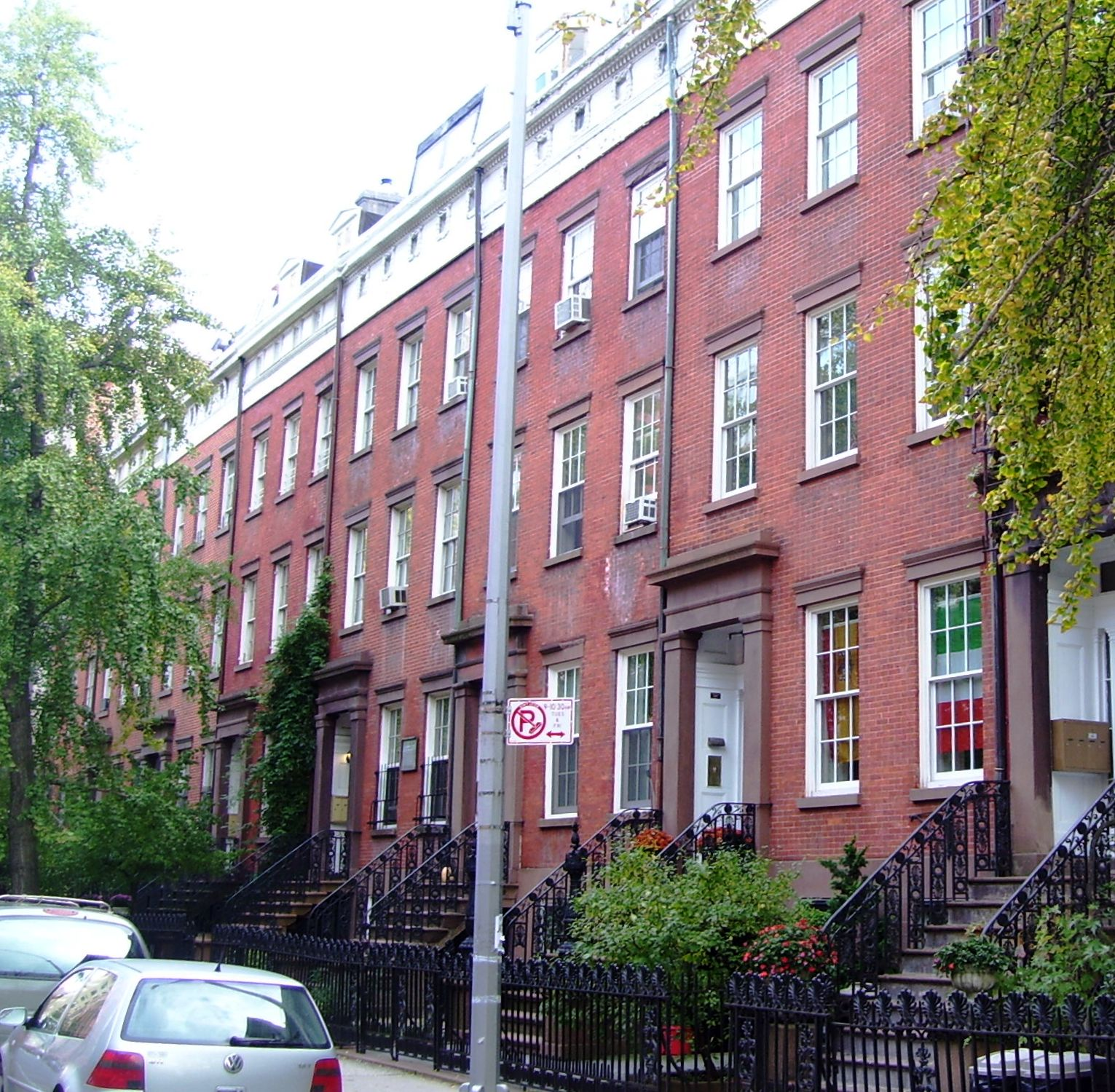
- The Cushman Row, 406–418 W. 20th St., dates from 1840
- Location: Roughly: West 19th – West 23rd Streets; Eighth –Tenth Avenues (Note: These are the boundaries of the historic district, not of the neighborhood. See NYCLPC map of Chelsea Historic District)
- Coordinates: 40°44′43″N 74°00′08″W
- Built: 1830
- Architect: Multiple
- Architectural style: Greek Revival, Italianate, Georgian
- NRHP reference No.: 77000954 (original); 82001190 (increase)
- NYCL No.: 0666, 1088

Significant dates
- Added to NRHP: December 6, 1977 (original); December 16, 1982 (increase)
- Designated NYSRHP: June 23, 1980
- Designated NYCL: September 15, 1970; February 3, 1981 (extension)

Chelsea is a neighborhood on the West Side of the borough of Manhattan in New York City. The area's boundaries are roughly 14th Street to the south, the Hudson River and West Street to the west, and Sixth Avenue to the east, with its northern boundary variously described as near the upper 20s or 34th Street, the next major crosstown street to the north. To the northwest of Chelsea is the neighborhood of Hell's Kitchen, as well as Hudson Yards; to the northeast are the Garment District and the remainder of Midtown South; to the east are NoMad and the Flatiron District; to the southwest is the Meatpacking District; and to the south and southeast are the West Village and the remainder of Greenwich Village. (Note: Neighborhoods in New York City do not have official status, and their boundaries are not specifically set by the city. (There are a number of Community Boards, whose boundaries are officially set, but these are fairly large and generally contain a number of neighborhoods, and the neighborhood map issued by the Department of City Planning only shows the largest ones.) Because of this, the definition of where neighborhoods begin and end is subject to a variety of forces, including the efforts of real estate concerns to promote certain areas, the use of neighborhood names in media news reports, and the everyday usage of people.) Chelsea was named after an estate in the area which, in turn, was named after the Royal Hospital Chelsea in London which, in its turn, was named after the Chelsea district of London (England).

Chelsea contains the Chelsea Historic District and its extension, which were designated by the New York City Landmarks Preservation Commission in 1970 and 1981 respectively. The district was added to the National Register of Historic Places in 1977, and expanded in 1982 to include contiguous blocks containing particularly significant examples of period architecture.

The neighborhood is primarily residential, with a mix of tenements, apartment blocks, two city housing projects, townhouses, and renovated rowhouses, and its many retail businesses reflect the ethnic and social diversity of the population. The area has a large LGBTQ population. Chelsea is also known as one of the centers of the city's art world, with over 200 galleries in the neighborhood. As of 2015, due to the area's gentrification, there is a widening income gap between the wealthy living in luxury buildings and some people living in the two housing projects.

Chelsea is a part of Manhattan Community District 4 and Manhattan Community District 5, and its primary ZIP Codes are 10001 and 10011. It is patrolled by the 10th Precinct of the New York City Police Department.

== History ==
=== Early development ===
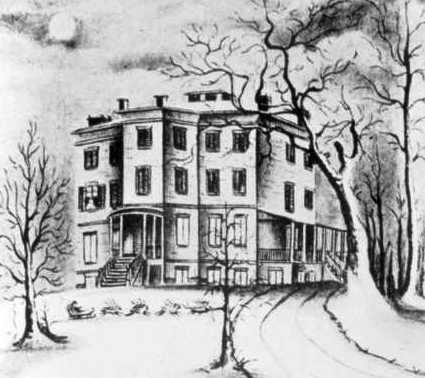
"Chelsea", drawn by a daughter of Clement Clarke Moore

Chelsea takes its name from the estate and Georgian-style house of retired British Major Thomas Clarke, who obtained the property when he bought the farm of Jacob Somerindyck on August 16, 1750. The land was bounded by what would become 21st and 24th Streets, from the Hudson River to Eighth Avenue. Clarke chose the name "Chelsea" after the Royal Hospital Chelsea in London. Clarke passed the estate on to his daughter, Charity, who, with her husband Benjamin Moore, added land on the south of the estate, extending it to 19th Street. The house was the birthplace of their son, Clement Clarke Moore, who in turn inherited the property. Moore is generally credited with writing "A Visit From St. Nicholas" and was the author of the first Greek and Hebrew lexicons printed in the United States.

In 1827, Moore gave the land of his apple orchard to the Episcopal Diocese of New York for the General Theological Seminary, which built its brownstone Gothic, tree-shaded campus south of the manor house. Despite his objections to the Commissioner's Plan of 1811, which ran the new Ninth Avenue through the middle of his estate, Moore began the development of Chelsea with the help of James N. Wells, dividing it up into lots along Ninth Avenue and selling them to well-heeled New Yorkers. Covenants in the deeds of sale specified what could be built on the land – stables, manufacturing and commercial uses were forbidden – as well as architectural details of the buildings. In 1829, Moore leased one of the lots to Hugh Walker who constructed what is now the oldest standing house in Chelsea, completed in 1830.

=== Industrialization and entertainment district ===
The new neighborhood thrived for three decades, with many single family homes and rowhouses, in the process expanding past the original boundaries of Clarke's estate, but an industrial zone also began to develop along the Hudson. In 1847 the Hudson River Railroad laid its freight tracks up a right-of-way between Tenth and Eleventh Avenues, separating Chelsea from the Hudson River waterfront. By the time of the Civil War, the area west of Ninth Avenue and below 20th Street was the location of numerous distilleries making turpentine and camphene, a lamp fuel. In addition, the huge Manhattan Gas Works complex, which converted bituminous coal into gas, was located at Ninth Avenue and 18th Street.

The industrialization of western Chelsea brought immigrant populations from many countries to work in the factories, including a large number of Irish immigrants, who dominated work on the Hudson River piers that lined the nearby waterfront and the truck terminals integrated with the freight railroad spur. (Note: The film On the Waterfront (1954) recreates this tough world, dramatized in Richard Rodgers' 1936 jazz ballet Slaughter on Tenth Avenue.) As well as the piers, warehouses and factories, the industrial area west of Tenth Avenue also included lumberyards and breweries, and tenements built to house the workers. With the immigrant population came the political domination of the neighborhood by the Tammany Hall machine, as well as festering ethnic tensions: around 67 people died in a riot between Irish Catholics and Irish Protestants on July 12, 1871, which took place around 24th Street and Eighth Avenue. The social problems of the area's workers provoked John Lovejoy Elliott to form the Hudson Guild in 1897, one of the first settlement houses – private organizations designed to provide social services.

A theater district had formed in the area by 1869, and soon West 23rd Street was the center of American theater, led by Pike's Opera House (1868, demolished after a fire in 1960), on the northwest corner of Eighth Avenue. Chelsea was a busy entertainment district between about 1880 and 1920. Sixth Avenue contained the Ladies' Mile shopping district; music publishers opened offices in Tin Pan Alley along 28th Street; and the Tenderloin red-light district occupied the northern section of Chelsea.

=== Early and mid-20th centuries ===
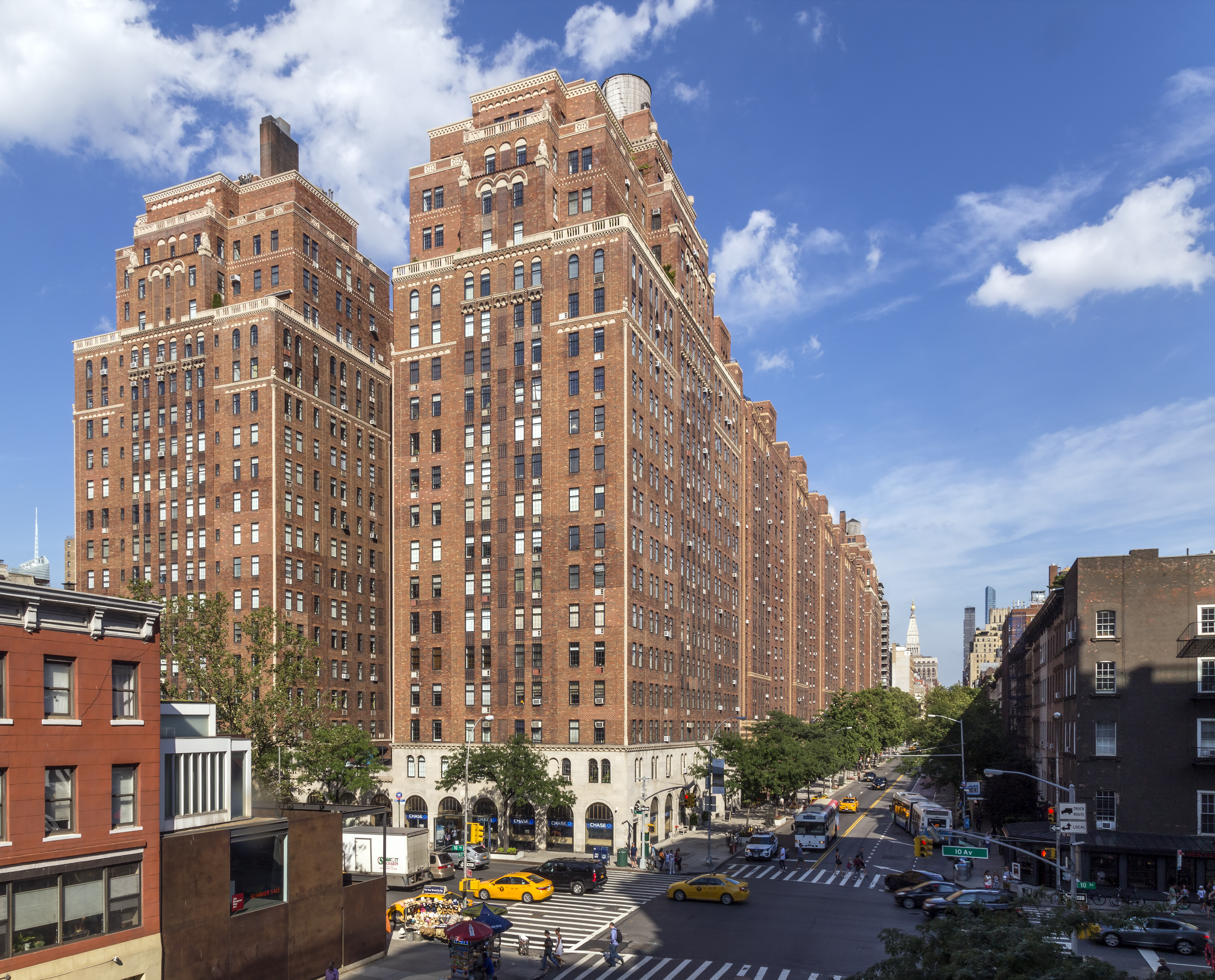
London Terrace occupies the entire block bounded Ninth and Tenth Avenues and 23rd and 24th Streets.

The neighborhood was an early center for the motion picture industry before World War I. Some of Mary Pickford's first pictures were made on the top floors of an armory building at 221 West 26th Street, while other studios were located on 23rd and 21st Streets.

To accommodate high freight and industrial demand, several railroads had built rail freight terminals on the Manhattan side of the Hudson River, and many freight terminals and warehouses were built in the western part of Chelsea by the late 19th century. The first of these was the Central Stores, constructed at 11th Avenue between 27th and 28th Streets in 1891. This was followed in 1900 by the Lehigh Valley Railroad's terminal between 26th and 27th Streets, as well as the Baltimore and Ohio Railroad's terminal immediately to the south, completed in the early 1910s. Freight operations on Manhattan's far west side were improved when the elevated West Side Freight Line and the West Side Elevated Highway were built in the 1930s, replacing a surface-level railroad and roadway.

London Terrace was one of the world's largest apartment blocks when it opened in 1930, with a swimming pool, solarium, gymnasium, and doormen dressed as London bobbies. Other major housing complexes in the Chelsea area are Penn South, a 1962 cooperative housing development sponsored by the International Ladies Garment Workers' Union, and the New York City Housing Authority-built and -operated Fulton Houses and Chelsea-Elliot Houses.

The 23-story Art Deco Walker Building, which spans the block between 17th and 18th Streets just off of Seventh Avenue, was built in the early 1930s. That structure was converted in 2012 to residential apartments on the top 16 floors, with Verizon retaining the lower seven floors. In the early 1940s, tons of uranium for the Manhattan Project were stored in the Baker & Williams Warehouse at 513–519 West 20th Street. The uranium was removed and a decontamination project at the site was completed during the early 1990s. By the mid-20th century, the western part of Chelsea had various types of light manufacturing businesses. According to the New York City Landmarks Preservation Commission, these ranged "from printing shops and box companies, to milk-bottling plants and electrical wire and cable manufacturers".

=== Late 20th century to present ===
The industrial character of West Chelsea declined in the 1960s and 1970s, as industries started to relocate from Manhattan. In subsequent years, the area's redevelopment was concentrated around West Chelsea, and some of the old industrial structures were converted to nightclubs. These included Les Mouches (housed in a former Otis Elevator Company factory) and the Tunnel (housed in the Central Stores building on 11th Avenue). Many LGBTQ people started moving to Chelsea in the mid-1980s, and upscale restaurants and stores began opening in the neighborhood around the same time. By then, the neighborhood also contained some of New York City's "cutting-edge theaters and performance spaces" according to The New York Times. By the late 1990s, West Chelsea had also begun to attract visual-arts galleries that had relocated from SoHo.

On September 17, 2016, there was an explosion outside a building on 23rd Street, which injured 29 people; police located and removed a second, undetonated pressure cooker bomb on 27th Street. A suspect, Ahmad Khan Rahami, was captured two days later after a gunfight in Linden, New Jersey.

By the late 2010s, the eastern part of Chelsea, which had once been largely industrial, had also attracted upscale residential development.

== Demographics ==
For census purposes, the New York City government classifies Chelsea as part of a larger neighborhood tabulation area called Hudson Yards-Chelsea-Flatiron-Union Square. Based on data from the 2010 United States census, the population of Hudson Yards-Chelsea-Flatiron-Union Square was 70,150, a change of 14,311 (20.4%) from the 55,839 counted in 2000. Covering an area of 851.67 acres (344.66 ha), the neighborhood had a population density of 82.4/acre (52,700/sq mi; 20,400/km^{2}). The racial makeup of the neighborhood was 65.1% (45,661) White, 5.7% (4,017) African American, 0.1% (93) Native American, 11.8% (8,267) Asian, 0% (21) Pacific Islander, 0.4% (261) from other races, and 2.3% (1,587) from two or more races. Hispanic or Latino of any race were 14.6% (10,243) of the population.

The entirety of Community District 4, which comprises Chelsea and Hell's Kitchen, had 122,119 inhabitants as of NYC Health's 2018 Community Health Profile, with an average life expectancy of 83.1 years. This is higher than the median life expectancy of 81.2 for all New York City neighborhoods. Most inhabitants are adults: a plurality (45%) are between the ages of 25–44, while 26% are between 45 and 64, and 13% are 65 or older. The ratio of youth and college-aged residents was lower, at 9% and 8% respectively.

As of 2017, the median household income in Community Districts 4 and 5 was $101,981. In 2018, an estimated 11% of Chelsea and Hell's Kitchen residents lived in poverty, compared to 14% in all of Manhattan and 20% in all of New York City. One in twenty residents (5%) were unemployed, compared to 7% in Manhattan and 9% in New York City. Rent burden, or the percentage of residents who have difficulty paying their rent, is 41% in Chelsea and Hell's Kitchen, compared to the boroughwide and citywide rates of 45% and 51% respectively. Based on this calculation, as of 2018, Chelsea and Hell's Kitchen are considered to be high-income relative to the rest of the city and not gentrifying.

== Culture ==
People of many different cultures live in Chelsea. Chelsea is famous for having a large LGBTQ population, with one of Chelsea's census tracts reporting that 22% of its residents were gay couples, and is known for its social diversity and inclusion. Eighth Avenue is a center for LGBT-oriented shopping and dining, and from 16th to 22nd Streets between Ninth and Tenth Avenues, mid-nineteenth-century brick and brownstone townhouses are still occupied, a few even restored to single family use.

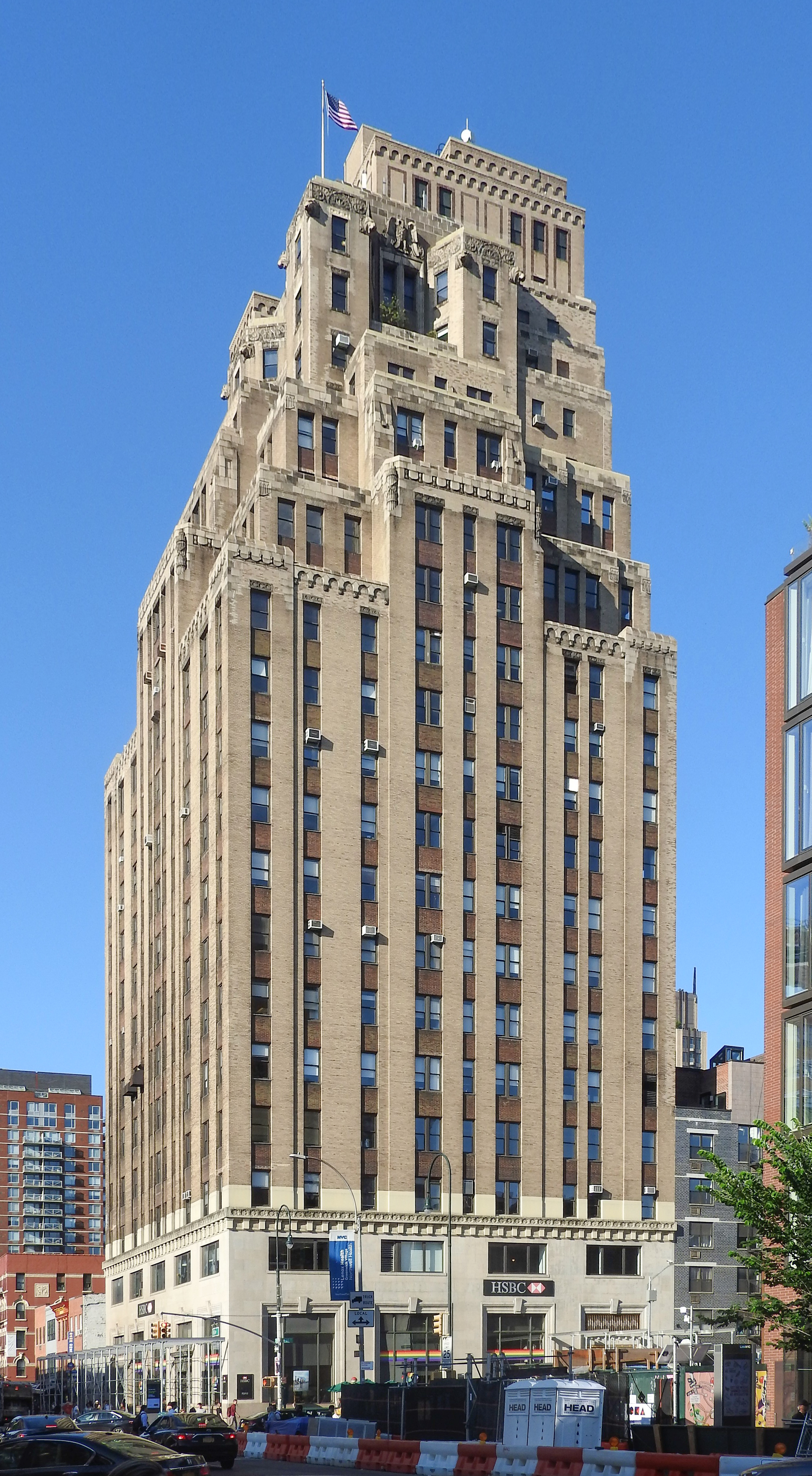
The Art Deco 80 Eighth Avenue was completed in 1929

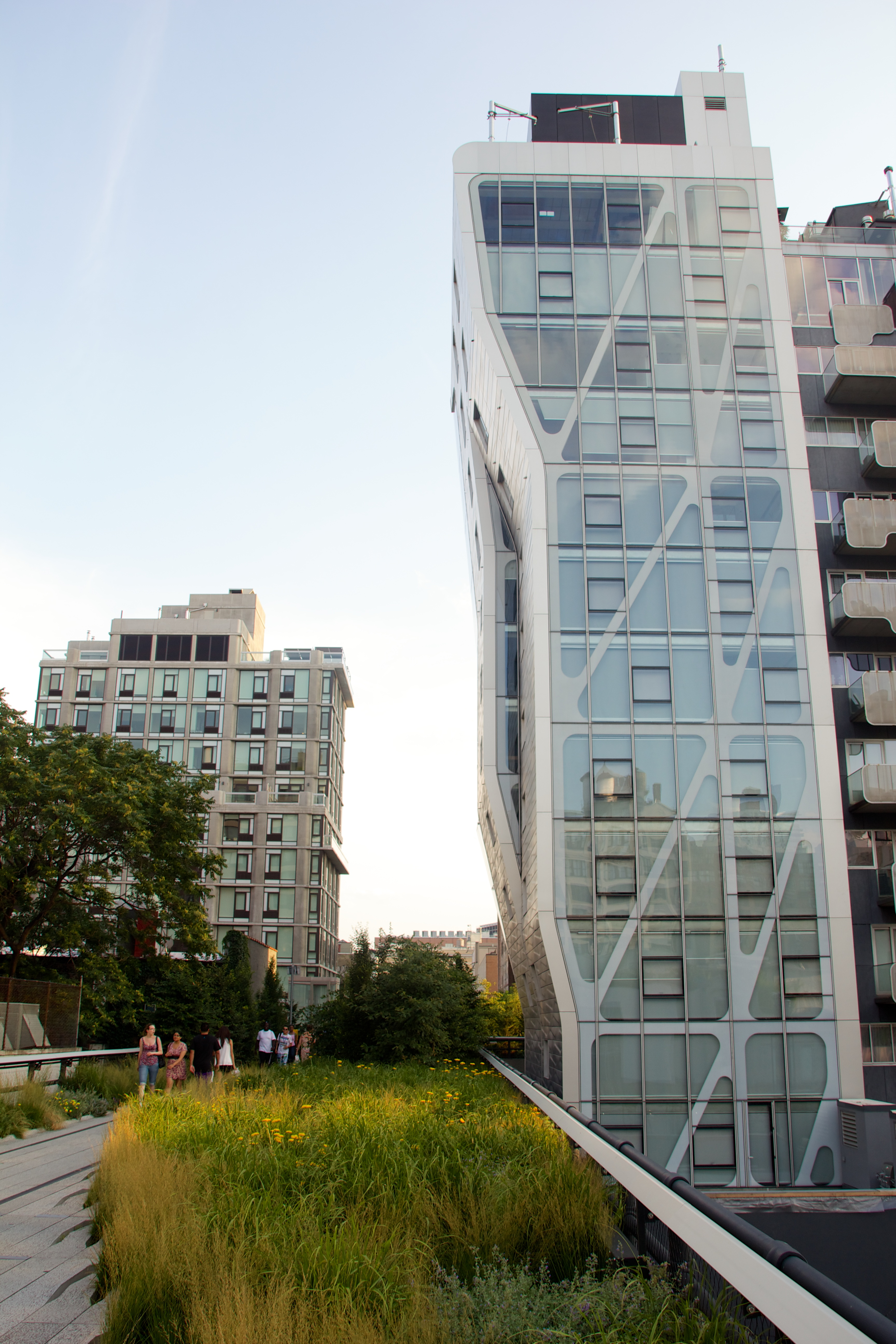
HL23, a luxury apartment building along the High Line

The stores of Chelsea reflect the ethnic and social diversity of the area's population. The Chelsea Lofts district – the former fur and flower district – is located roughly between Sixth and Seventh Avenues from 23rd to 30th streets. The McBurney YMCA on West 23rd Street, commemorated in the hit Village People song Y.M.C.A., sold its home and relocated in 2002 to a new facility on 14th Street, the neighborhood's southern border.

By the late 20th and early 21st centuries, Chelsea had become an alternative shopping destination, starring the likes of Barneys CO-OP — which replaced the much larger original Barneys flagship store — Comme des Garçons, Balenciaga boutiques, Alexander McQueen, Stella McCartney, and Christian Louboutin. Chelsea Market, on the ground floor of the former Nabisco Building, is a destination for food lovers. In the late 1990s, New York's visual arts community began a gradual transition away from SoHo, due to increasing rents and competition from upscale retailers for the large and airy spaces that art galleries require, and the area of West Chelsea between Tenth and Eleventh Avenues and 16th and 28th Streets has become a new global centers of contemporary art, home to over 200 art galleries that are home to modern art from both upcoming and established artists. Along with the art galleries, Chelsea is home to the Rubin Museum of Art, with a focus on Himalayan art; the Graffiti Research Lab and New York Live Arts, a producing and presenting organization of dance and other movement-based arts. The community, in fact, is home to many highly regarded performance venues, among them the Joyce Theater, one of the city's premier modern dance emporiums, and The Kitchen, a center for cutting-edge theatrical and visual arts.

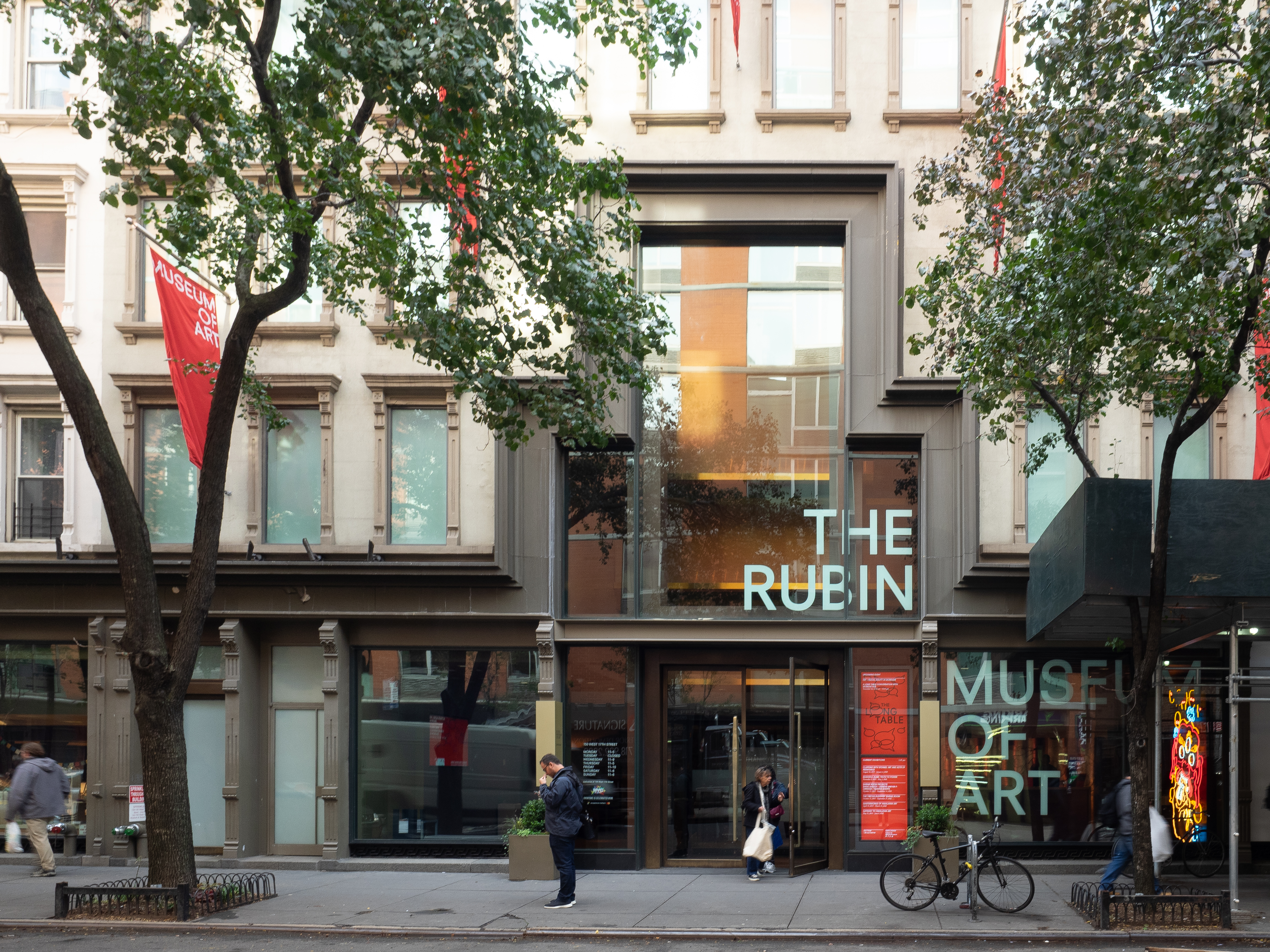
The Rubin Museum of Art

Above 23rd Street, by the Hudson River, the neighborhood is post-industrial, featuring the elevated High Line viaduct, which follows the river all through Chelsea. The elevated rail line was the successor to the street-level freight line original built through Chelsea in 1847, which was the cause of numerous fatal accidents, so it was elevated in the early 1930s by the New York Central Railroad. It fell out of use in the 1960s through 1980 and was originally slated to be torn down, but in the early 2000s, it was redesigned and converted into a highly used aerial greenway and rails-to-trails park. With a change in zoning resolution in conjunction with the development of the High Line, Chelsea experienced a new construction boom, with projects by notable architects such as Shigeru Ban, Neil Denari, Jean Nouvel, and Frank Gehry. The neighborhood was quickly gentrifying, with small businesses being replaced by big-box retailers and technology and fashion stores. With this development, more wealthy residents moved in, further widening an already-existing income gap with public-housing residents. In 2015, the average yearly household income in most of Chelsea was about $140,000. On the other hand, in the area's two public-housing developments – the Elliott-Chelsea Houses, between 25th Street, Ninth Avenue, 28th Street, and Tenth Avenue; and Fulton Houses, between 16th Street, Ninth Avenue, 19th Street, and Tenth Avenue – the average income was less than $30,000. At the same time, the area's Puerto Rican enclaves and rent-subsidized housing, especially in Penn South, was being replaced by high-rent studios. This resulted in large income disparities across the neighborhood; one block in particular – 25th Street between 9th and 10th Avenues – had the Elliot Houses on its north side and two million-dollar residences on its south side.

The Chelsea neighborhood is served by two weekly newspapers: the Chelsea-Clinton News and Chelsea Now.

West Chelsea refers to the western portion of Chelsea, previously known as Gasoline Alley, much of which was previously a manufacturing area and has since been rezoned to allow for high-rise residential uses. It is often considered the area of Chelsea between the Hudson River to the west and Tenth Avenue to the east, a portion of which was designated a historic district in 2008. A 2008 article in The New York Times showed the eastern boundary of West Chelsea as Eighth Avenue for the area between 14th and 23rd streets, Ninth Avenue between 23rd and 25th, and Tenth Avenue between 25th and 29th.

== Landmarks and places of interest ==
=== Culinary ===
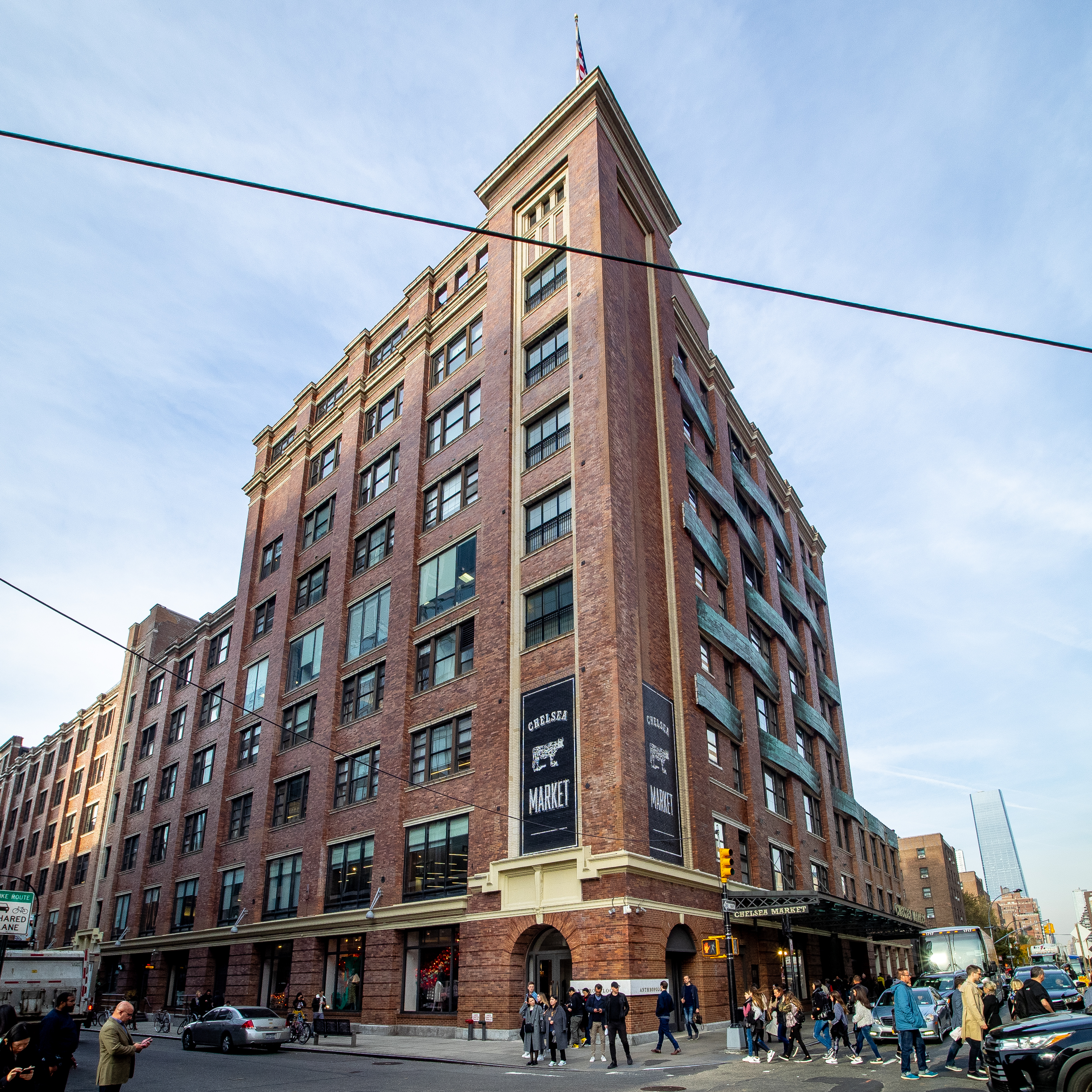
Chelsea Market contains a popular food hall

The Chelsea Market, located in a restored historic Nabisco factory and headquarters, is a festival marketplace that hosts a variety of shopping and dining options, including bakeries, restaurants, a fish market, wine store, and many others.

Peter McManus Cafe, a bar and restaurant on Seventh Avenue at 19th Street, is among the oldest family-owned and -operated bars in the city.

The Empire Diner was an art moderne diner at 210 Tenth Avenue at 22nd Street that appeared in several movies and was mentioned in Billy Joel's song "Great Wall of China". Designed by Fodero Dining Car Company, it was built in 1946 and was altered in 1979 by Carl Laanes. The diner closed on May 15, 2010; reopened briefly as "The Highliner", and again re-opened under its original name in January 2014 before closing permanently in December 2015 due to failure to pay rent.

=== Cultural ===
Pike's Opera House was built in 1868, and bought the next year by James Fisk and Jay Gould, who renamed it the Grand Opera House. Located on the corner of Eighth Avenue and 23rd Street, it survived until 1960 as an RKO movie theater.

The Irish Repertory Theatre is an Off-Broadway theatrical company on West 22nd Street producing plays by Irish and Irish-American writers.

The Joyce Theater, located in the former Elgin Theater at 175 Eighth Avenue, near 19th Street, is in a 1941 movie house that closed in 1978. The Elgin was completely renovated to create in the Joyce a venue suitable for dance, and was reopened in 1982.

The Kitchen is a performance space at 512 West 19th Street. It was founded in Greenwich Village in 1971 by Steina and Woody Vasulka, taking its name from the original location, the kitchen of the Mercer Arts Center.

The warehouse building at 530 West 27th Street, which was the site of The Sound Factory & Twilo, as well as several other megaclubs in the 1980s and 1990s, was acquired in 2011 by the British theater company Punchdrunk, who converted it into "The McKittrick Hotel", a five-story, 100,000 sq ft (9,300 m^{2}) performance space housing their immersive site-specific theatrical production, Sleep No More. The building, along with those at 532 and 542 West 27th Street, was also the location of several restaurants and event venues, and featured other shows such as 'Speakeasy Magick', featuring Todd Robbins, Jason Suran, and Matthew Holtzclaw. The McKittrick and associated spaces closed in 2025 following the end of Sleep No More's theatrical run.

New York Live Arts is a dance organization located at 219 West 19th Street between 7th and 8th Avenues.

The Rubin Museum of Art is a museum dedicated to the collection, display, and preservation of the art of the Himalayas and surrounding regions, especially that of Tibet. It was located at 150 West 17th Street between Avenue of the Americas (Sixth Avenue) and Seventh Avenue. While the museum still exists as an institution, its Chelsea building closed on October 6, 2024.

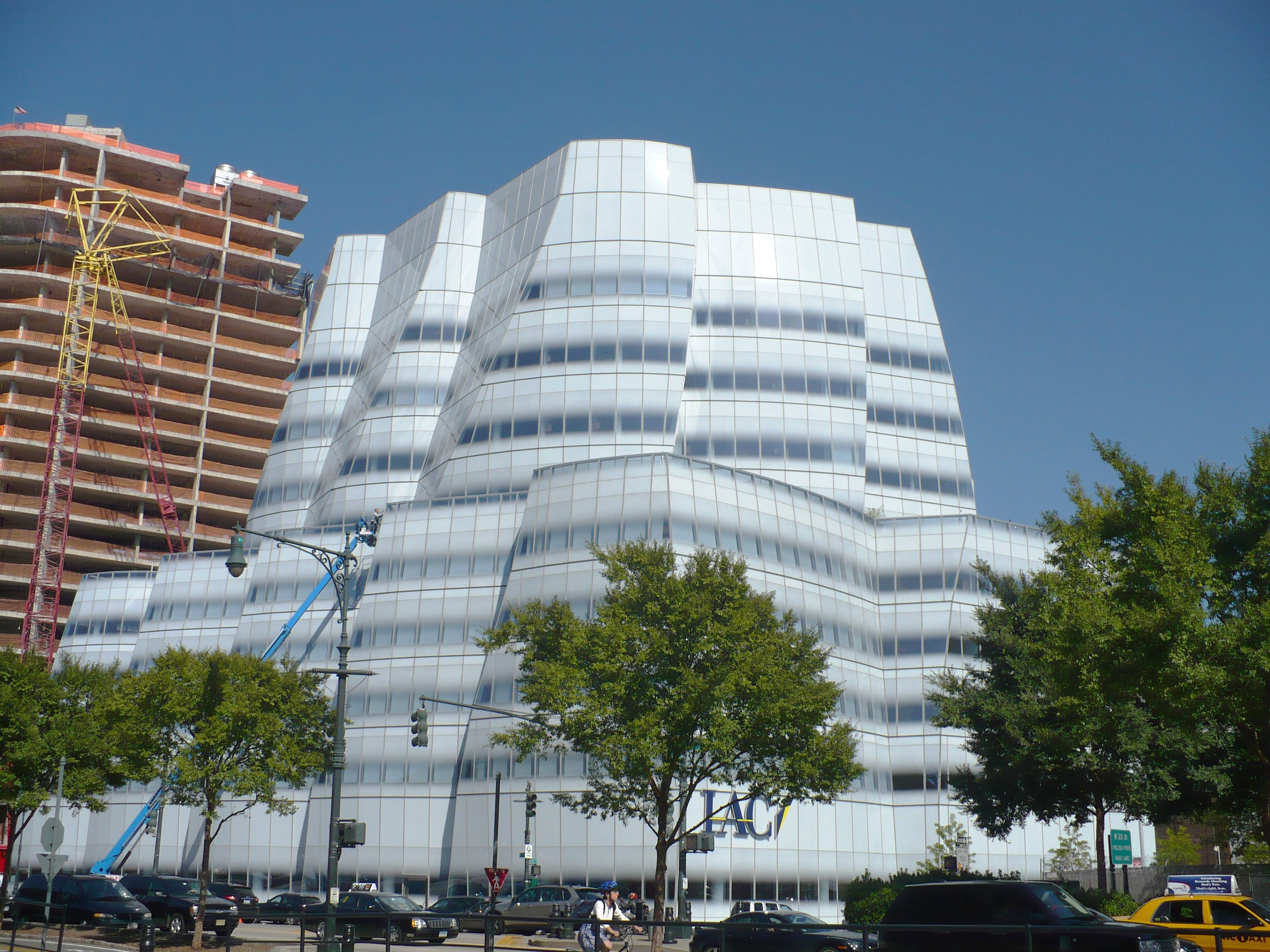
InterActiveCorp headquarters on Eleventh Avenue, designed by Frank Gehry

=== Industrial and commercial ===
Google's New York office occupies 111 Eighth Avenue, which takes up the full city block between 15th and 16th Streets and between Eighth and Ninth avenues. The building was once Inland Terminal 1 of the Port Authority of New York and New Jersey.

The Starrett-Lehigh Building, a huge full-block freight terminal and warehouse on West 26th Street between Eleventh and Twelfth avenues, was built in 1930–1931 as a joint venture of the Starett real estate firm and the Lehigh Valley Railroad. Designed by Cory & Cory to enable trains to pull into the ground floor of the building, it was one of only a few American buildings included in the Museum of Modern Art's 1932 "International Style" exhibition. It was designated a New York City landmark in 1966.

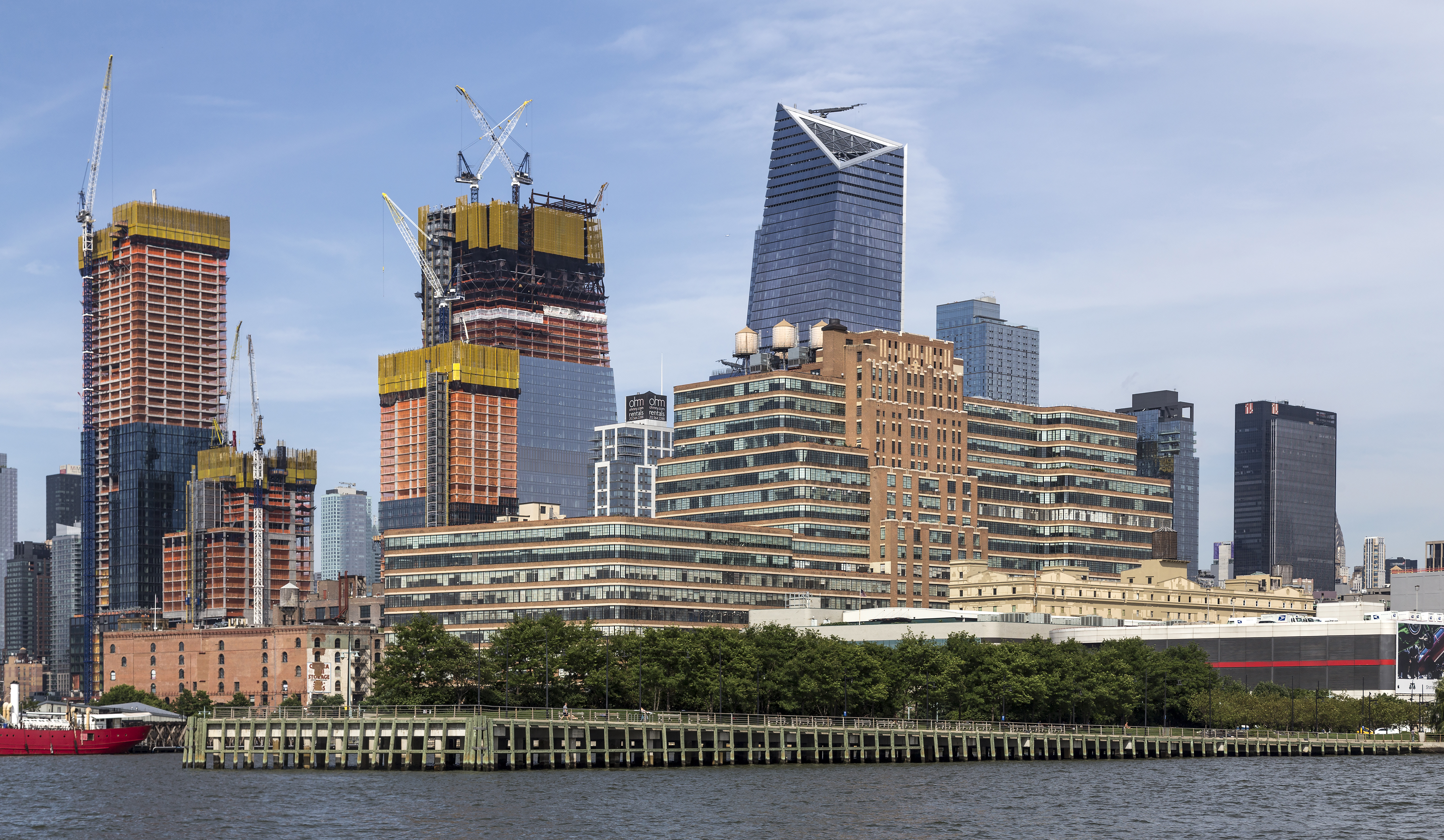
The Starrett–Lehigh Building with the rising skyscrapers of Hudson Yards rising in the background

The Hudson Yards rail-yard development is located at the northern edge of Chelsea, within the Hudson Yards neighborhood. The project's centerpiece is a mixed-use real estate development by Related Companies. According to its master plan, created by master planner Kohn Pedersen Fox Associates, Hudson Yards is expected to consist of 16 skyscrapers containing more than 1.27×10^{6} sq ft (118,000 m^{2}) of new office, residential, and retail space. Among its components will be 6×10^{6} sq ft (560,000 m^{2}) of commercial office space, a 750,000 sq ft (70,000 m^{2}) retail center with two levels of restaurants, cafes, markets and bars, a hotel, a cultural space, about 5,000 residences, a 750-seat school, and 14 acres (5.7 ha) of public open space. The development, located mainly above and around the West Side Yard, forms a new neighborhood that overlaps with Chelsea and Hell's Kitchen.

=== Residential ===
Hotel Chelsea, built 1883–1885 and designed by Hubert, Pirsson & Co., was New York's first cooperative apartment complex and was the tallest building in the city until 1902. After the theater district migrated uptown and the neighborhood became commercialized, the residential building folded and in 1905 it was turned into a hotel. The hotel attracted attention as the place where Dylan Thomas had been staying when he died in 1953 at St. Vincent's Hospital in Greenwich Village, and for the 1978 slaying of Nancy Spungen for which Sid Vicious was accused. The hotel has been the home of numerous celebrities, including Brendan Behan, Thomas Wolfe, Mark Twain, Tennessee Williams and Virgil Thomson, and the subject of books, films (Chelsea Girls, 1966) and music.

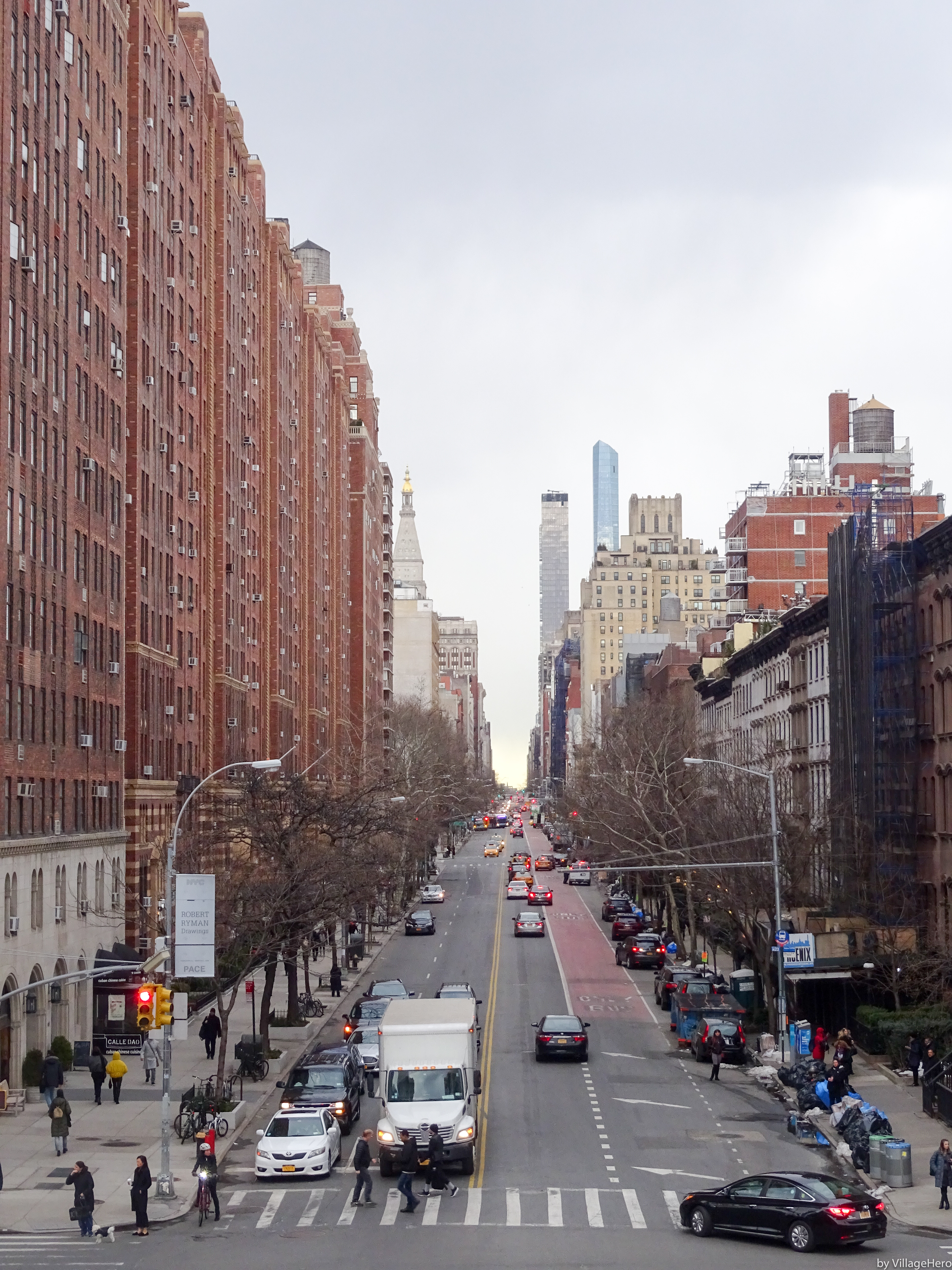
An eastward facing view from the High Line. London Terrace is visible on the left.

The London Terrace apartment complex on West 23rd was one of the world's largest apartment blocks when it opened in 1930, with a swimming pool, solarium, gymnasium, and doormen dressed as London bobbies. It was designed by Farrar and Watmough. It takes its name from the fashionable mid-19th century cottages that were once located there.

Penn South is a large limited-equity housing cooperative constructed in 1962 by the United Housing Foundation and financed by the International Ladies' Garment Workers' Union. The development includes 2,820 apartments and covers six city blocks between Eighth and Ninth avenues and 23rd and 29th streets. In 2012, there were 6,000 names on a waiting list of prospective residents looking to purchase a unit in the development. Under the terms of agreements reached with the City of New York in 1986 and 2002, and separately with the United States Department of Housing and Urban Development, Penn South's eligibility for tax abatements offered by the Mitchell-Lama Housing Program has been extended to 2052.

The eleven (originally twelve) row houses at 437–459 West 24th Street are designated as New York City landmarks and on the National Register of Historic Places.

=== Other ===
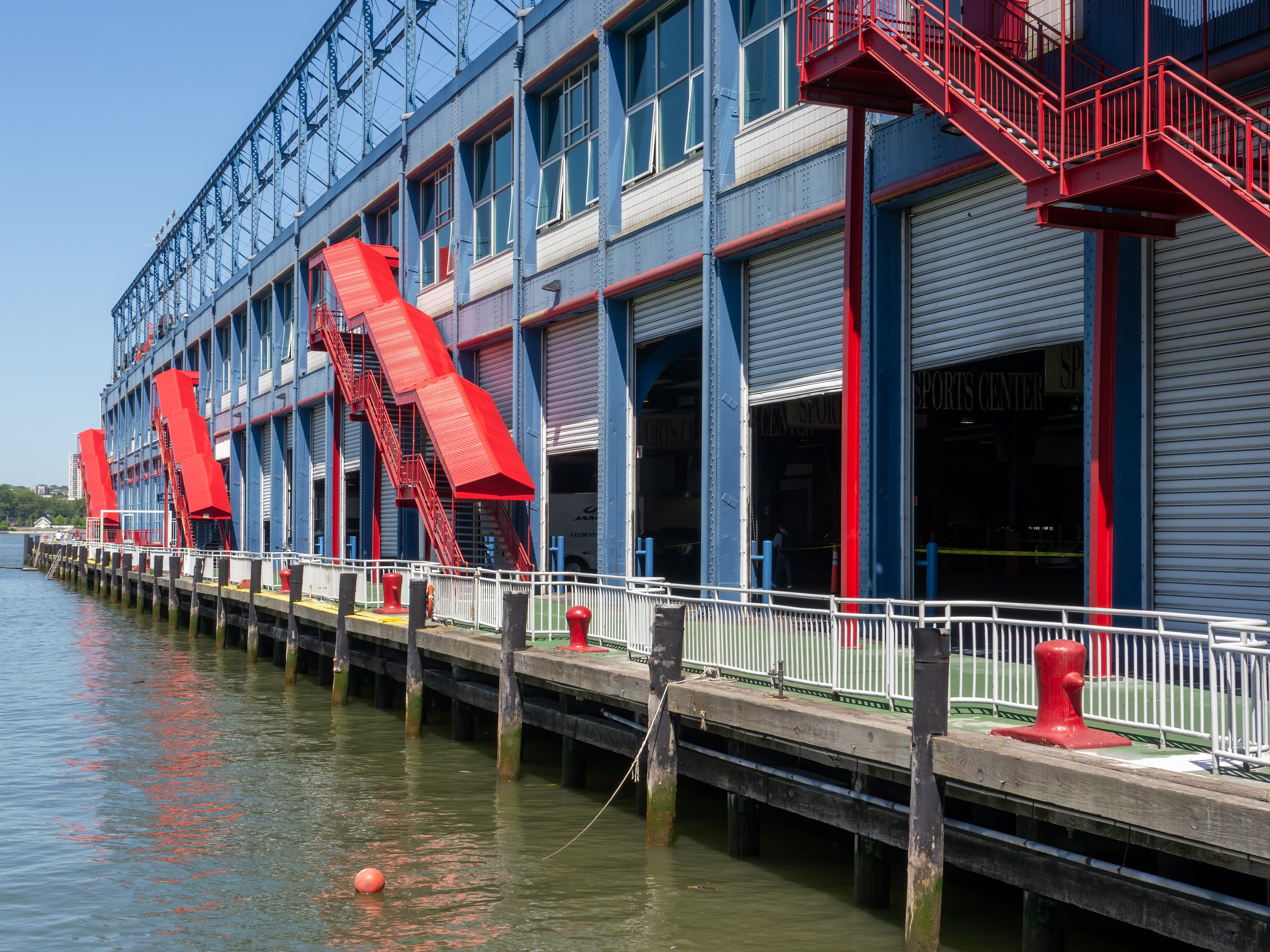
The Chelsea Piers, New York City's primary luxury ocean liner terminal from 1910 until 1935

The Chelsea Piers were the city's primary luxury ocean liner terminal from 1910 until 1935, when the growing size of ships made the complex inadequate. The RMS Titanic was headed to Pier 60 at the piers and the RMS Carpathia brought survivors to Pier 54 in the complex, which was destroyed in 2018 although ironwork remains. The northern piers are now part of an entertainment and sports complex operated by Roland W. Betts, and the southern piers are part of Hudson River Park. The Hudson River Park, designed as a joint city/state park with non-traditional uses, runs along the Hudson River waterfront from 59th Street to the Battery and comprises most of the associated piers.

Chelsea Park is located between 9th and 10th Avenues, and between 27th and 28th Streets. It contains baseball diamonds, basketball courts and six handball courts.

Chelsea Studios, a sound stage on 26th Street, has been operating since 1914, and numerous movies and television shows have been produced there.

The Church of the Holy Apostles was built in 1845–1848 to a design by Minard Lefever, with additions by Lefever in 1853–1854, and transepts by Charles Babcock added in 1858, this Italianate church was designated a New York City landmark in 1966 and is listed on the National Register of Historic Places. It is Lefever's only surviving building in Manhattan. The building, which featured an octagonal spire, was burned in a serious fire in 1990, but stained glass windows by William Jay Bolton survived, and the church reopened in April 1994 after a major restoration. The Episcopal parish is notable for hosting the city's largest program to feed the poor, and is the second and larger home of the LGBTQ-oriented synagogue, Congregation Beth Simchat Torah.

The General Theological Seminary of the Episcopal Church's college-like close is sometimes called "Chelsea Square". It consists of a city block of tree-shaded lawns between Ninth and Tenth Avenues and West 20th and 21st Streets. The campus is ringed by more than a dozen brick and brownstone buildings in Gothic Revival style. The oldest building on the campus dates from 1836. Most of the rest were designed as a group by architect Charles Coolidge Haight, under the guidance of the Dean, Augustus Hoffman. In 2024, Vanderbilt University entered into a lease with The General Theological Seminary to establish a Vanderbilt campus in New York City. "The leasing arrangement is not a merger with The General Theological Seminary. The Seminary will continue to operate as a separate entity and maintain its distinct identity and programming."

== Police and crime ==
Chelsea is patrolled by the 10th Precinct of the NYPD, located at 230 West 20th Street. The 10th Precinct ranked 61st safest out of 69 patrol areas for per-capita crime in 2010. As of 2018, with a non-fatal assault rate of 34 per 100,000 people, Chelsea and Hell's Kitchen's rate of violent crimes per capita is less than that of the city as a whole. The incarceration rate of 313 per 100,000 people is lower than that of the city as a whole.

The 10th Precinct has a lower crime rate than in the 1990s, with crimes across all categories having decreased by 74.8% between 1990 and 2018. The precinct reported 1 murder, 19 rapes, 81 robberies, 103 felony assaults, 78 burglaries, 744 grand larcenies, and 26 grand larcenies auto in 2018.

== Fire safety ==
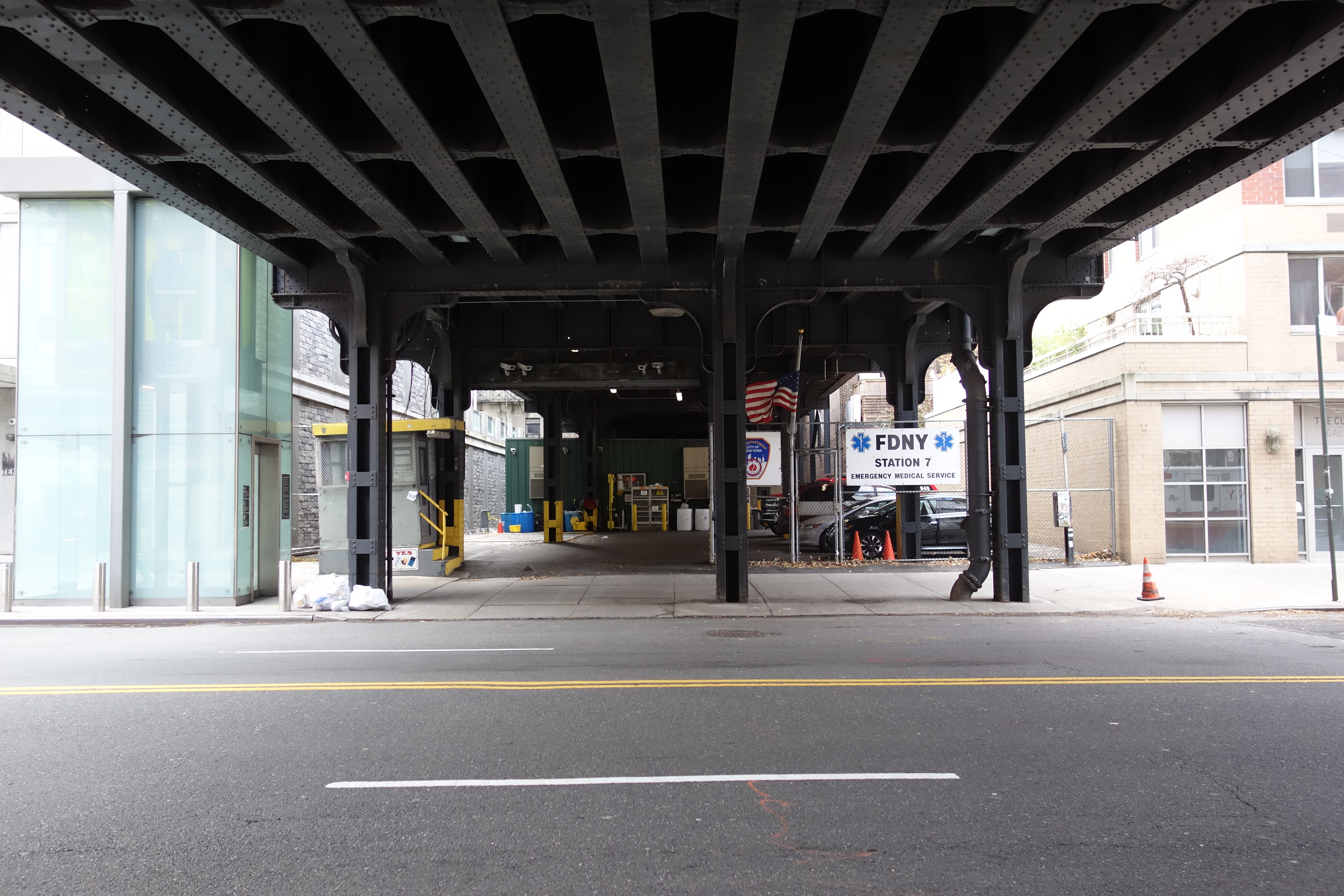
FDNY EMS Station 7

Chelsea is served by two fire stations of the New York City Fire Department (FDNY). Engine Company 1/Ladder Company 24 is located at 142 West 31st Street, while Engine Company 3/Ladder Company 12/Battalion 7 is located at 146 West 19th Street. In addition, FDNY EMS Station 7 is located at 512 West 23rd Street.

== Health ==
Preterm births in Chelsea and Hell's Kitchen are the same as the city average, though teenage births are less common. In Chelsea and Hell's Kitchen, there were 87 preterm births per 1,000 live births (compared to 87 per 1,000 citywide), and 9.9 teenage births per 1,000 live births (compared to 19.3 per 1,000 citywide). Chelsea and Hell's Kitchen have a low population of residents who are uninsured. In 2018, this population of uninsured residents was estimated to be 11%, slightly less than the citywide rate of 12%.

The concentration of fine particulate matter, the deadliest type of air pollutant, in Chelsea and Hell's Kitchen is 0.0098 mg/m^{3} (9.8×10^{−9} oz/ft^{3}), more than the city average. Eleven percent of Chelsea and Hell's Kitchen residents are smokers, which is less than the city average of 14% of residents being smokers. In Chelsea and Hell's Kitchen, 10% of residents are obese, 5% are diabetic, and 18% have high blood pressure—compared to the citywide averages of 24%, 11%, and 28% respectively. In addition, 14% of children are obese, compared to the citywide average of 20%.

Ninety-one percent of residents eat some fruits and vegetables every day, which is higher than the city's average of 87%. In 2018, 86% of residents described their health as "good", "very good", or "excellent", more than the city's average of 78%. For every supermarket in Chelsea and Hell's Kitchen, there are 7 bodegas.

The nearest major hospitals are the Bellevue Hospital Center and NYU Langone Medical Center in Kips Bay. In addition, Beth Israel Medical Center in Stuyvesant Town operated until 2025.

== Post offices and ZIP Codes ==
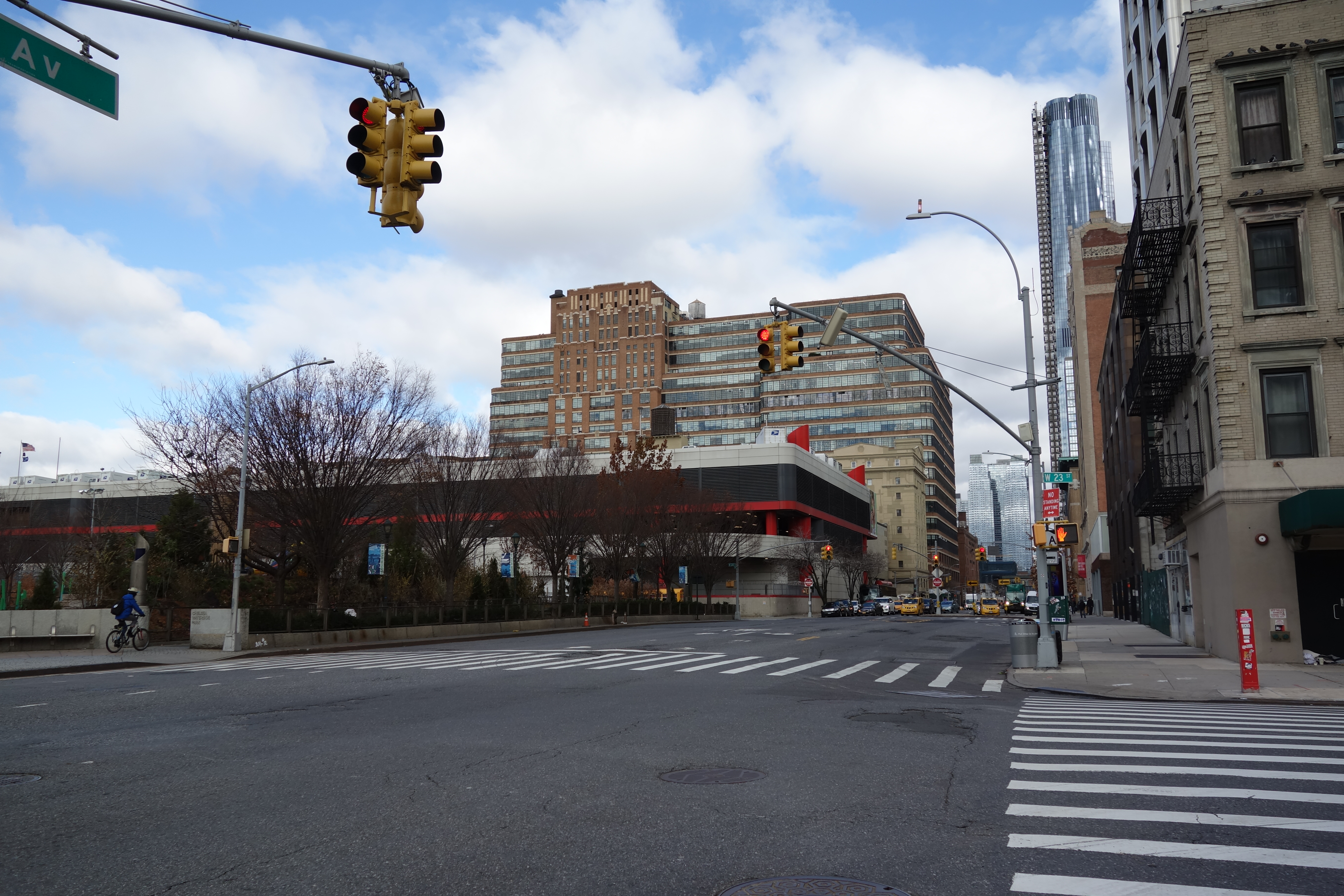
USPS maintenance facility, 11th Avenue

Chelsea is located within two primary ZIP Codes. The area north of 24th Street is in 10001 while the area south of 24th Street is in 10011. The United States Postal Service operates four post offices in Chelsea:

- James A. Farley Station – 421 8th Avenue; the main post office for New York City
- London Terrace Station – 234 10th Avenue
- Old Chelsea Station – 217 West 18th Street
- Port Authority Station – 74 9th Avenue

In addition, the Centralized Parcel Post and the Morgan General Mail Facility are located at 341 9th Avenue. The USPS also operates a vehicle maintenance facility on the block bounded by 11th Avenue, 24th Street, 12th Avenue, and 26th Street. This facility has the ZIP Code 10199.

== Education ==
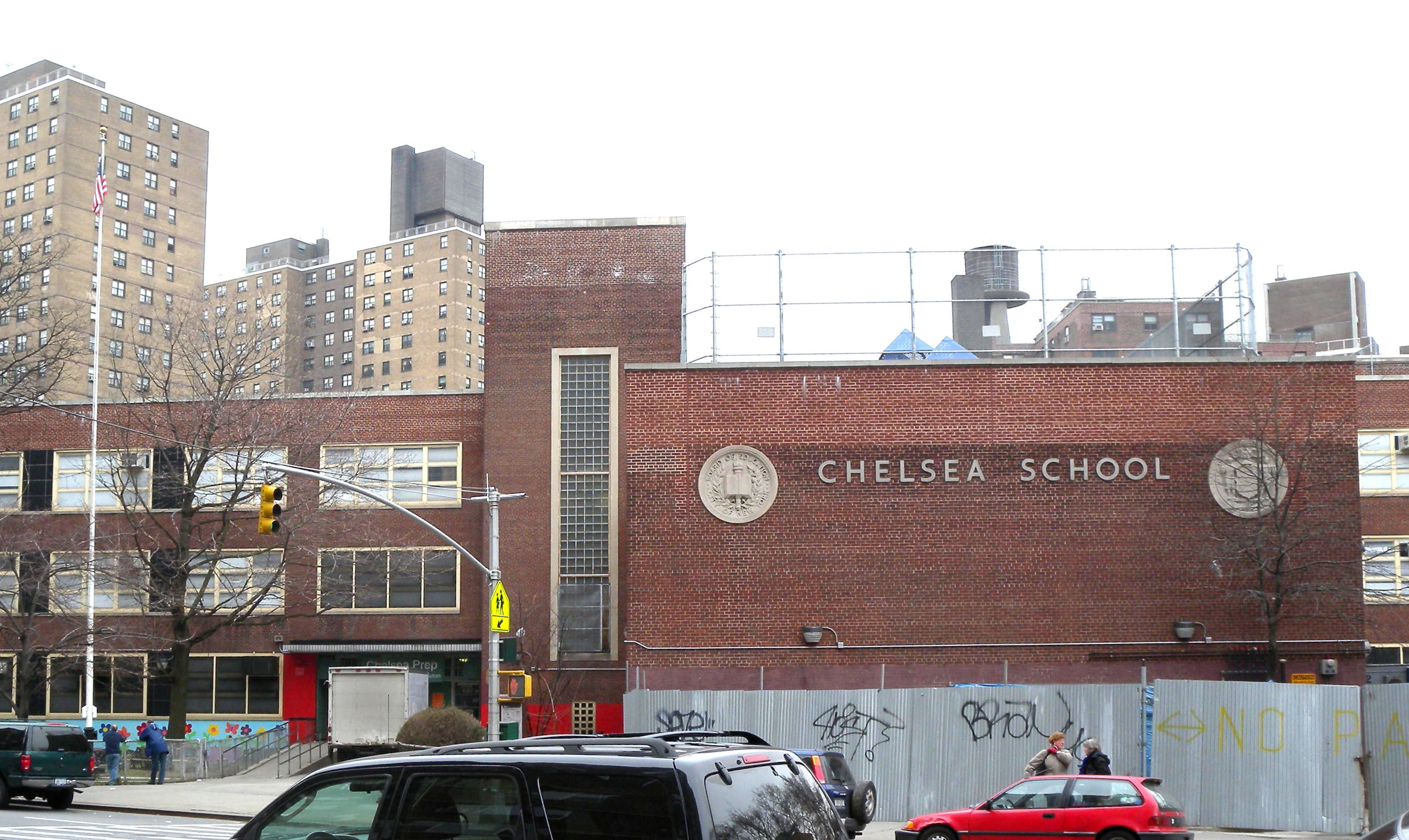
The Chelsea School

Chelsea and Hell's Kitchen generally have a higher rate of college-educated residents than the rest of the city as of 2018. A majority of residents age 25 and older (78%) have a college education or higher, while 6% have less than a high school education and 17% are high school graduates or have some college education. By contrast, 64% of Manhattan residents and 43% of city residents have a college education or higher. The percentage of Chelsea and Hell's Kitchen students excelling in math rose from 61% in 2000 to 80% in 2011, and reading achievement increased from 66% to 68% during the same time period.

Chelsea and Hell's Kitchen's rate of elementary school student absenteeism is lower than the rest of New York City. In Chelsea and Hell's Kitchen, 16% of elementary school students missed twenty or more days per school year, less than the citywide average of 20%. Additionally, 81% of high school students in Chelsea and Hell's Kitchen graduate on time, more than the citywide average of 75%.

=== Schools ===
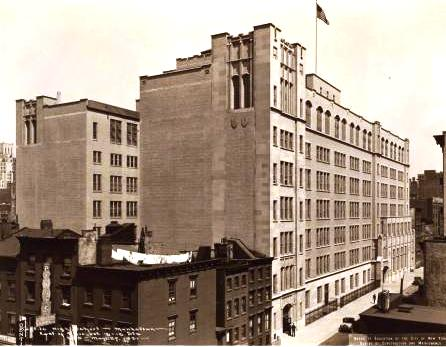
The Bayard Rustin Educational Complex in 1931, when it was Textile High School

There are numerous public schools in Chelsea, including PS 11, also known as the William T. Harris School; PS 33, the Chelsea School; the O. Henry School (IS 70); Liberty High School For Newcomers; Lab School; the Museum School; and the Bayard Rustin Educational Complex, which houses six small schools.

The Bayard Rustin Educational Complex was founded as Textile High School in 1930, later renamed to Straubenmuller Textile High School, then Charles Evans Hughes High School. In the 1990s, it was renamed the Bayard Rustin High School for the Humanities after civil rights activist Bayard Rustin. The high school closed in 2012 after a grading scandal, but the building had already started being used as a "vertical campus" housing multiple small schools. Quest to Learn, Hudson High School of Learning Technologies, Humanities Preparatory Academy, James Baldwin School, Landmark High School, and Manhattan Business Academy are the six constituent schools in the complex.

Private schools in the neighborhood include Avenues: The World School, a K-12 school, the Catholic Xavier High School, a secondary school, and the New York campus of Winston Preparatory School, a grades 4-12 special education school.

Chelsea is also home to the Fashion Institute of Technology, a specialized SUNY unit established in 1944 that serves as a training ground for the city's fashion and design industries. The School of Visual Arts, a for-profit art school, and the public High School of Fashion Industries also have a presence in the design fields.

The neighborhood is also home to the General Theological Seminary of the Episcopal Church, the oldest seminary in the Anglican Communion. The Center for Jewish History, a consortium of several national research organizations, is a unified library, exhibition, conference, lecture, and performance venue, located on 16th Street between Fifth and Sixth Avenues.

=== Libraries ===
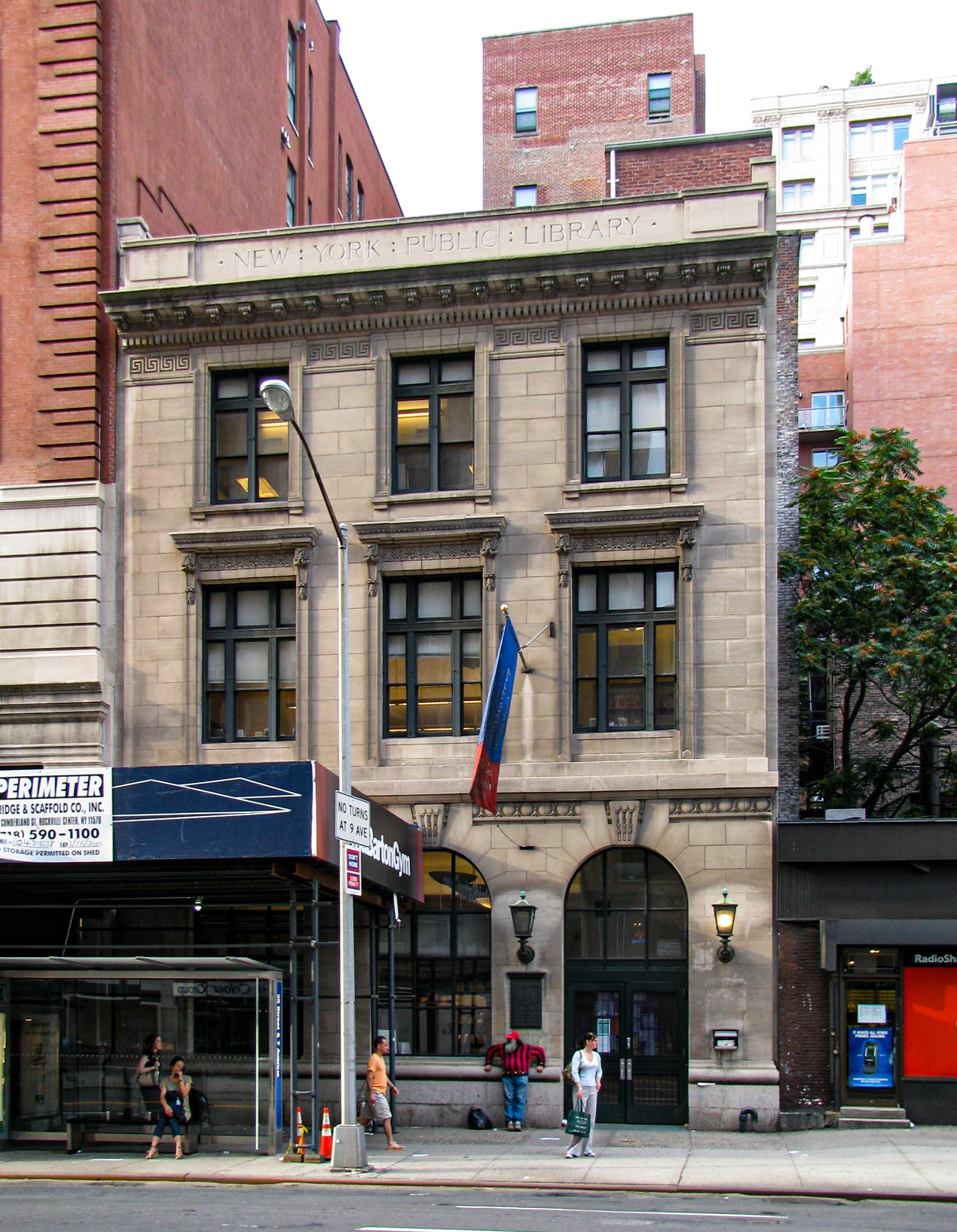
The Muhlenberg branch of the New York Public Library

The New York Public Library (NYPL) operates two branches in Chelsea. The Muhlenberg branch is located at 209 West 23rd Street. The three-story Carnegie library building opened in 1906 and was renovated in 2000. The Andrew Heiskell Braille and Talking Book Library is located at 40 West 20th Street. The current building opened in 1990; the Library of Congress has designated the Heiskell branch as the city's "Regional Library of the National Library Service for the Blind and Physically Handicapped" for Braille media and audiobooks.

== Transportation ==
The neighborhood is served by the M7, M10, M11, M12, M14 SBS and M23 SBS New York City Bus routes. New York City Subway routes include the 1, 2, and 3 services on Seventh Avenue, the A, C, and E services on Eighth Avenue, and the F, <F>, and M services on Sixth Avenue. The 34th Street – Hudson Yards station on the 7 and <7> trains opened in September 2015 with its main entrance in Chelsea.

== Notable residents ==
- Edwin Howard Armstrong (1890–1954), radio-frequency engineer and inventor who developed FM radio
- Andy Bey (1939-2025), jazz singer and pianist
- Erik Bottcher (born 1979), politician who has served in the New York State Senate since 2026
- Louise Bourgeois (1911–2010), artist best known for her large-scale sculpture and installation art
- Gerald Busby (born 1935), composer
- Bill Cannastra (1921–1950), member of the early Beat Generation scene
- Louise Whitfield Carnegie (1857–1946), philanthropist who was the wife of Andrew Carnegie
- Rosanne Cash (born 1955), singer-songwriter and author, who is the eldest daughter of country musician Johnny Cash
- Adolphe de Chambrun (1831–1891), historian, jurist and non-fiction writer
- Ching Ho Cheng (1946–1989), visual artist
- Nickolas Davatzes (1942–2021), television executive who was CEO of A&E Networks
- Bob Dylan (born 1941), singer-songwriter re in the Chelsea Hotel (1961–64)
- Whoopi Goldberg (born 1955), actor, lived in the Chelsea-Elliot Houses
- Jack Schlossberg (born 1993), political commentator and author
- Silas Seandel (born 1937), furniture sculptor
- Wallace Shawn (born 1943), actor, lives in Chelsea

== See also ==
- List of neighborhoods in Manhattan
- Chelsea Corners
