= Chelsea Corners =

Building in Manhattan, New York

Coordinates: 40.73996°N 73.99900°W

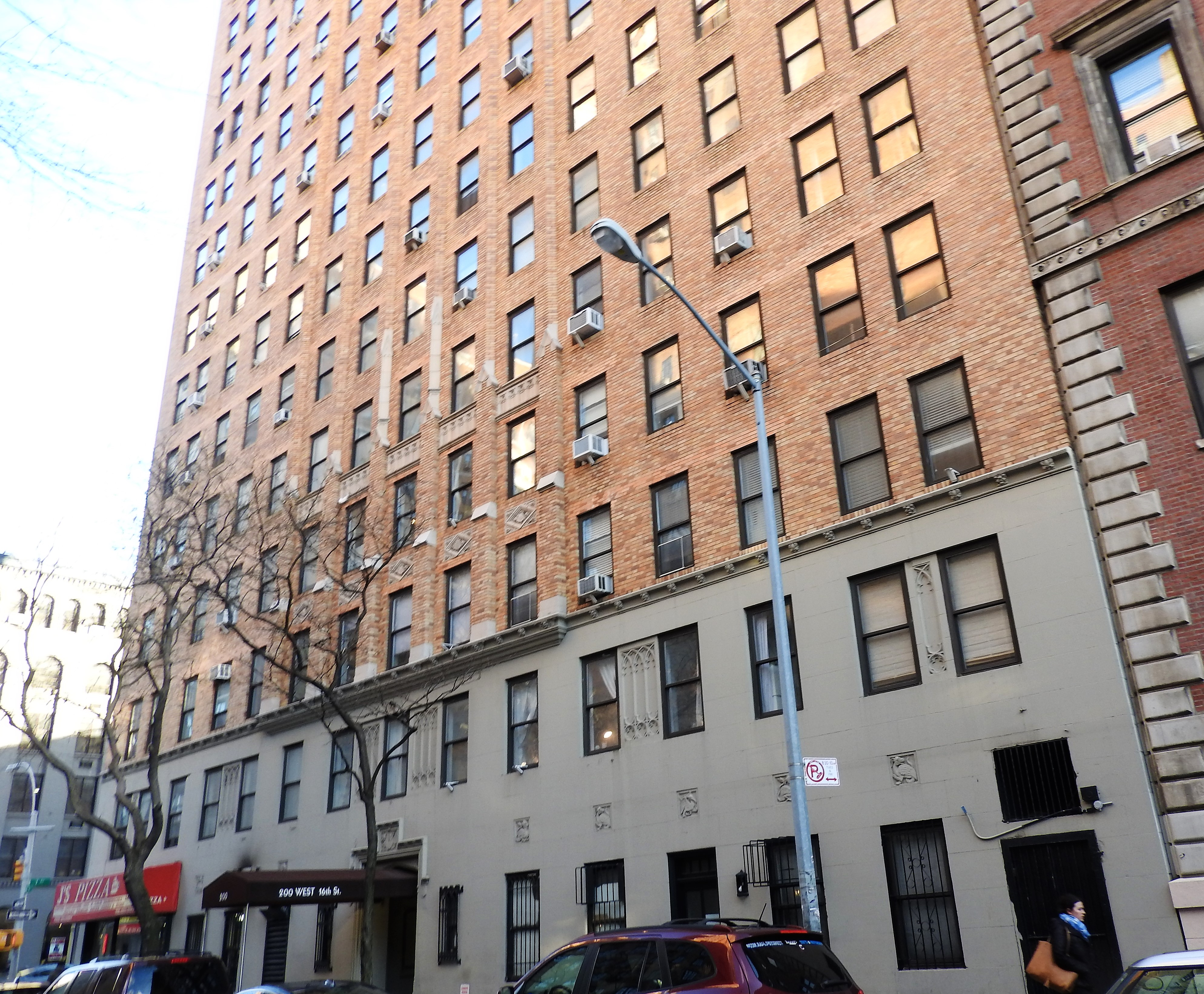
200 West 16th Street

Chelsea Corners was an apartment complex built in 1931 at 15th Street and 16th Street, in Chelsea, Manhattan. It is currently a co-op. The first building was completed at 200 West 16th Street in May 1931. The development, planned for completion in fall 1931, was only partially finished due to the Great Depression.

The projected cost was $50,000,000. Chelsea Corners was a portion of an undertaking by Henry Mandel to rebuild 7th Avenue, just below 23rd Street, with a number of tall apartment buildings. The edifices are made of variegated orange brick and were designed by Farrar & Watmough, who were also responsible for the design of Mandel's London Terrace and Parc Vendome.

== Unfinished development and bankruptcy ==
In 1927 Mandel began to purchase large corners on 7th Avenue, to the north of 14th Street. The buyer was then forty-three years of age. Earlier he built tenements with his father, Samuel. The elder Mandel brought his family to New York City from Ukraine during the 1880s.

Mandel's intent was to construct smaller, efficient apartments, for white collar employees who would eschew a prestigious neighborhood for one which would provide the ease of transit to and from work. When completed the apartments were to have numbered approximately 4,000. The Henry Mandel Companies leased the four edifices which were entirely finished.

Mandel filed for bankruptcy in 1932. At the time he possessed assets of $380,000 and liabilities of $14 million. The four finished buildings of Chelsea Corners passed into separate ownership. Mandel went to prison for several months in 1933 for nonpayment of $19,000 in alimony to his ex-wife, Bertha. He died in 1942 after having built a two-story theatre and nightclub at 79th Street and Madison Avenue.

== Interior design & recent history ==
The lobbies of the apartment structures at 200 West 15th Street and 200 West 16th Street possess fine vaulted ceilings and tile decoration, in polychrome. The one located at 161 West 16th Street received an art deco makeover in 1989. By 2004 steel casement windows, with common one-over-one aluminum windows, had replaced the more vigorous impression which Farrar & Watmough sought to impart, in three of the four structures. However the edifice at 201 West 16th Street received replicas of the original steel casement windows in 2004.

In the 1980s Barneys New York moved into the first four floors on the 7th Avenue side of the former apartment at 161 West 16th Street. In 2004 this space was occupied by Loehmann's. Barneys closed the window openings but left the original steel casement windows intact.

Chelsea Corners' structures were given a fresh paint job in 2004.
