= 437–459 West 24th Street =

Houses in Manhattan, New York

- Houses at 437–459 West 24th Street
- U.S. National Register of Historic Places
- New York State Register of Historic Places
- New York City Landmark
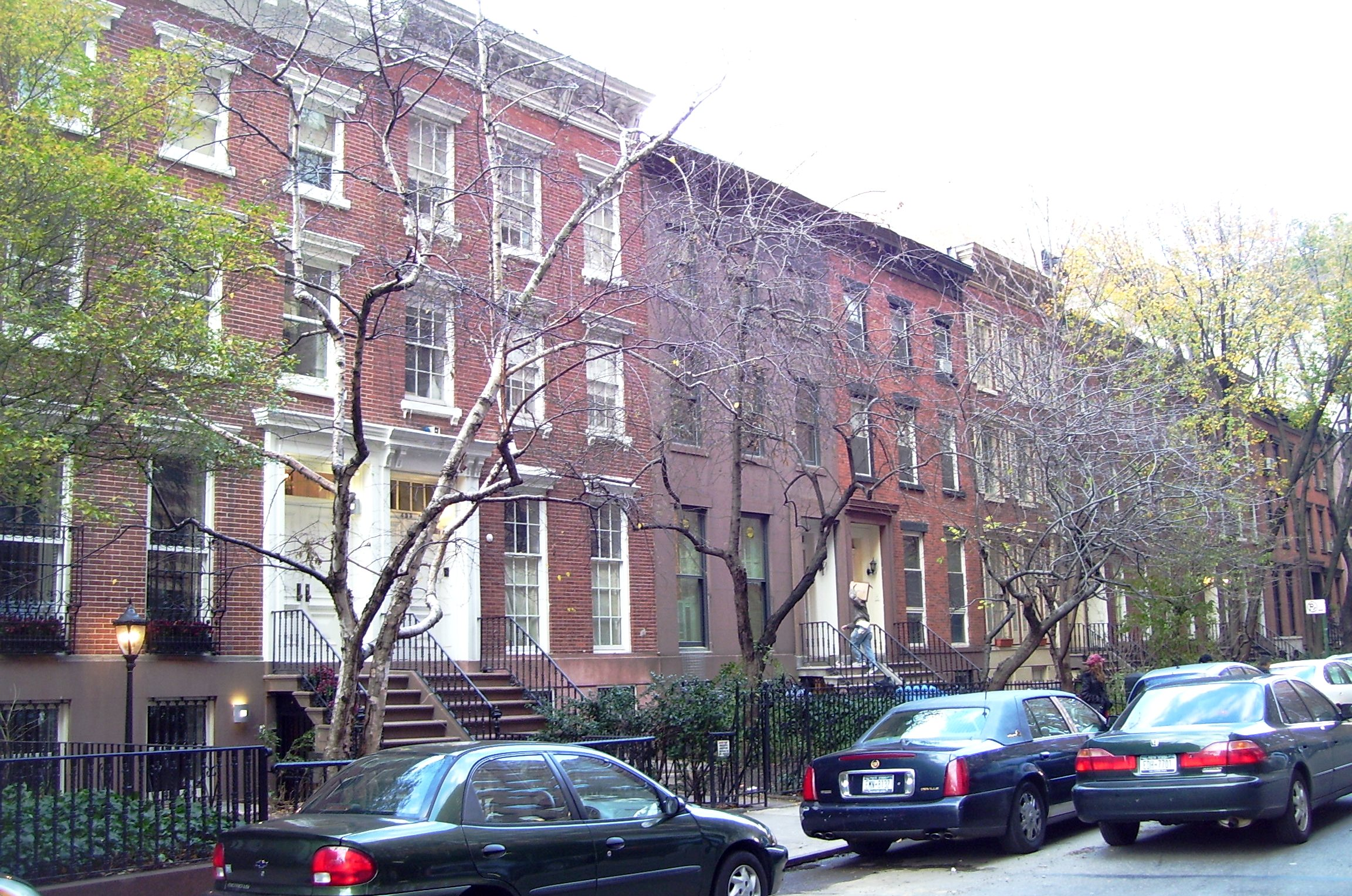

- Location within Manhattan Location within New York City Location within New York Location within the United States
- Location: 437–459 W. 24th St., New York, New York
- Coordinates: 40°44′53″N 74°00′11″W
- Area: 1.3 acres (0.53 ha)
- Built: 1849
- Built by: Beege,Philo V.
- Architectural style: Greek Revival, Italianate
- NRHP reference No.: 82001196
- NYSRHP No.: 06101.004524 – 06101.004534 (Note: Each of the 11 houses has its own state and city reference number. The reference numbers for the state and city designations correspond with the address numbers in ascending order. For example, 437 West 24th Street has state reference number 06101.004524 and city reference number 0679, while 459 West 24th Street has state reference number 06101.004524 and city reference number 0689.)
- NYCL No.: 0679–0689

Significant dates
- Added to NRHP: 1982-10-29
- Designated NYSRHP: 1982-09-27
- Designated NYCL: 1970-09-15

437–459 West 24th Street is a group of 11 houses in the Chelsea neighborhood of Manhattan in New York City, New York, U.S. The houses were built between 1849 and 1850, and are in a transitional style between Greek Revival and Italianate. There were originally 12 houses in total, grouped in six pairs; one set of houses, 443–445 West 24th Street, has been internally connected as a single building. Each house has a brick facade and is set back from the street. Although it is unknown who designed the houses, they were built by Philo Beebe. The buildings are New York City designated landmarks and on the National Register of Historic Places.

== Description ==
437–459 West 24th Street is located on the north side of 24th Street (between Ninth Avenue and Tenth Avenue) in the Chelsea neighborhood of Manhattan in New York City, New York, U.S. They are sited just north of the London Terrace apartment complex. There were originally 12 houses in total, grouped in six pairs. One set of houses, 443–445 West 24th Street, has been internally connected as a single building; its constituent houses were originally paired with 441 and 447 West 24th Street to the east and west, respectively. The houses are set back approximately 15 feet (4.6 m) from gardens facing the street. They adjoin 461 West 24th Street, a slightly smaller house that, although not landmarked, dates from the same period as 437–459 West 24th Street.

The houses are designed in a transitional style between the Greek Revival and Italianate styles; it is unknown who designed the houses, though Philo V. Beebe built them. Each house is a three-story brick structure with a front facade divided into three bays of windows, along with a cornice at its roofline that is decorated with modillions. Many of the residences retain their original gardens and other decorative details such as railings and stoops, although they have been modified with details in the Federal, Neo-Grec, and Queen Anne architectural styles. One writer said in 2016 that the houses were "outstanding for their surviving period details", and the AIA Guide to New York City called the front gardens "a refreshing pause in the streetscape".

=== House details ===
Numbers 437 and 439 are paired. They are set back from a railing, and both houses have front yards slightly beneath street level, with ailanthus trees. Their respective entrances are accessed from adjacent stoops (in the western bay of number 437 and the eastern bay of number 439), with Italianate ironwork; the two stoops originally contained railings with volutes, which were removed in successive renovations. Each house's stoop leads to doors with elaborate frames. The door of number 437 has Italianate decorations and a lion's head, while the door of number 439 has a sunburst decoration with a glazed transom window above. Beside the stoop, each house's first floor has nine-over-nine sash windows adjoining the doorway, while the second and third stories have six-over-six sash windows. The facade brick has been sandblasted, and each house has an Italianate cornice.

Numbers 441, 443–445, and 447 were originally two adjacent pairs, but the center two residences in this group have been combined to form number 443–445. Number 441 is set back from a railing, with a front yard containing a maple tree. The entrance is accessed by a stoop in its western bay with volutes and urns in its railing; it has a door with sunburst motif, a glazed transom window above, and a stucco frame. Number 443–445 is set back from a low railing, with entrances to the basement in the center bays and ascending to the first floor in the westernmost and easternmost bays. Number 443–445 also has sash windows, though the first-floor window sills are slightly above their original locations; the house retains its original Italianate cornice, with a roofline at the same height as the other ten houses. Number 447 was redecorated in the neo-Federal style some time after its completion. It is set back from a brick partition, with a front yard containing pebbled paving and a railing with fleur-de-lis decorations to its west. The entrance is accessed by a stoop in its eastern bay with volutes and urns in its railing; it has a door with sidelights and a fanlight. Numbers 441 and 447 have sash windows on upper stories, and similar Neo-Grec style cornices with hexagonal motifs.

Numbers 449 and 451 were originally paired (albeit with significant modifications) and are separated by an iron fence. Number 449's front yard has a pebbled surface with ailanthus trees. The entrance to number 449 is in the western bay; at some point in the 20th century, the original stoop was removed, and the entrance led directly to the basement instead of the first floor. The upper floors of number 449 retain the original brick facade, sash windows, and Italianate cornice. Number 451 has sculpture beds and ivy beds. The entrance to number 451 is accessed by a stoop in its eastern bay with volutes and urns in its railing; the door was narrowed at some point in its history. The upper floors of number 451 retain their sash windows and Italianate cornice, although the facade has been replaced with stucco, which is rusticated and is painted in a manner resembling brownstone.

Numbers 453 and 455 are paired, with a Greek Revival-style railing running between them. There is a high railing in front of number 453's yard, which has an ailanthus tree, and a low railing in front of number 455's yard, which has a maple tree. Their respective entrances are accessed from adjacent stoops (in the western bay of number 453 and the eastern bay of number 455), with Italianate ironwork railings containing volutes and urns. The doors have sawtooth designs, and the door frames of both houses' entrances originally had a shared lintel. Number 453's entrance has a set-back vestibule with outer and inner doors, both topped by transom windows. Both houses have sash windows on their facades. The cornice of number 453, dating from a late-19th-century modification, is slightly raised above those of the other houses, with decorative brackets. Number 455 has windows with guards at its first and third floors and has an Italianate cornice at its roofline.

Numbers 457 and 459 are paired, with a railing running between them. There is a high railing in front of number 457's yard and a low railing in front of number 459's yard, the latter of which has bluestone paving. Both yards have ivy and ailanthus trees. Their respective entrances are accessed from adjacent stoops (in the western bay of number 457 and the eastern bay of number 459), with Italianate ironwork railings containing volutes and urns. The door frames of both houses' entrances have a shared lintel. Number 457 has a paneled doorway with a recessed door behind it, while number 459 has a sunburst decoration in the Queen Anne style, surrounded by sidelights and a transom window. Both houses have sash windows on their facades and Italianate cornices at their rooflines.

== History ==
Between the 1820s and 1840s, Chelsea was developed as a residential neighborhood, with many single family homes and rowhouses built on and around the estate of retired British Major Thomas Clarke. Amid this wave of residential development, the houses on the north side of 24th Street were built by Philo V. Beebe, with Beverly Robinson (sometimes spelled Beverley) and George F. Talman as the developers. Robinson, an attorney, was affiliated with both the Clarke family and the related Moore family, of which the writer Clement Clarke Moore was a part. Robinson had first acquired the sites in 1820, and he continued to acquire land over the next decade; in April 1849, he sold the sites to Talman. Each of the houses was built between 1849 and 1850. At least two of the original residents were involved in construction: a lumber dealer who lived in number 449, and a contractor who lived in number 453.

All of the houses were designated as individual New York City landmarks on September 15, 1970. 437–459 West 24th Street was also listed on the National Register of Historic Places (NRHP) on October 29, 1982, as a single historic-site listing. In addition, the buildings are all listed on the New York State Register of Historic Places.

== See also ==
- National Register of Historic Places in Manhattan from 14th to 59th Streets
- List of New York City Designated Landmarks in Manhattan from 14th to 59th Streets

== Sources ==
- National Register of Historic Places Inventory/Nomination: Houses at 437–459 West 24th Street (PDF) (Report). National Park Service. October 29, 1982. With accompanying pictures
