= Elliott-Chelsea Houses =

Public housing development in Manhattan, New York

Chelsea-Elliott Houses
- NYCHA property
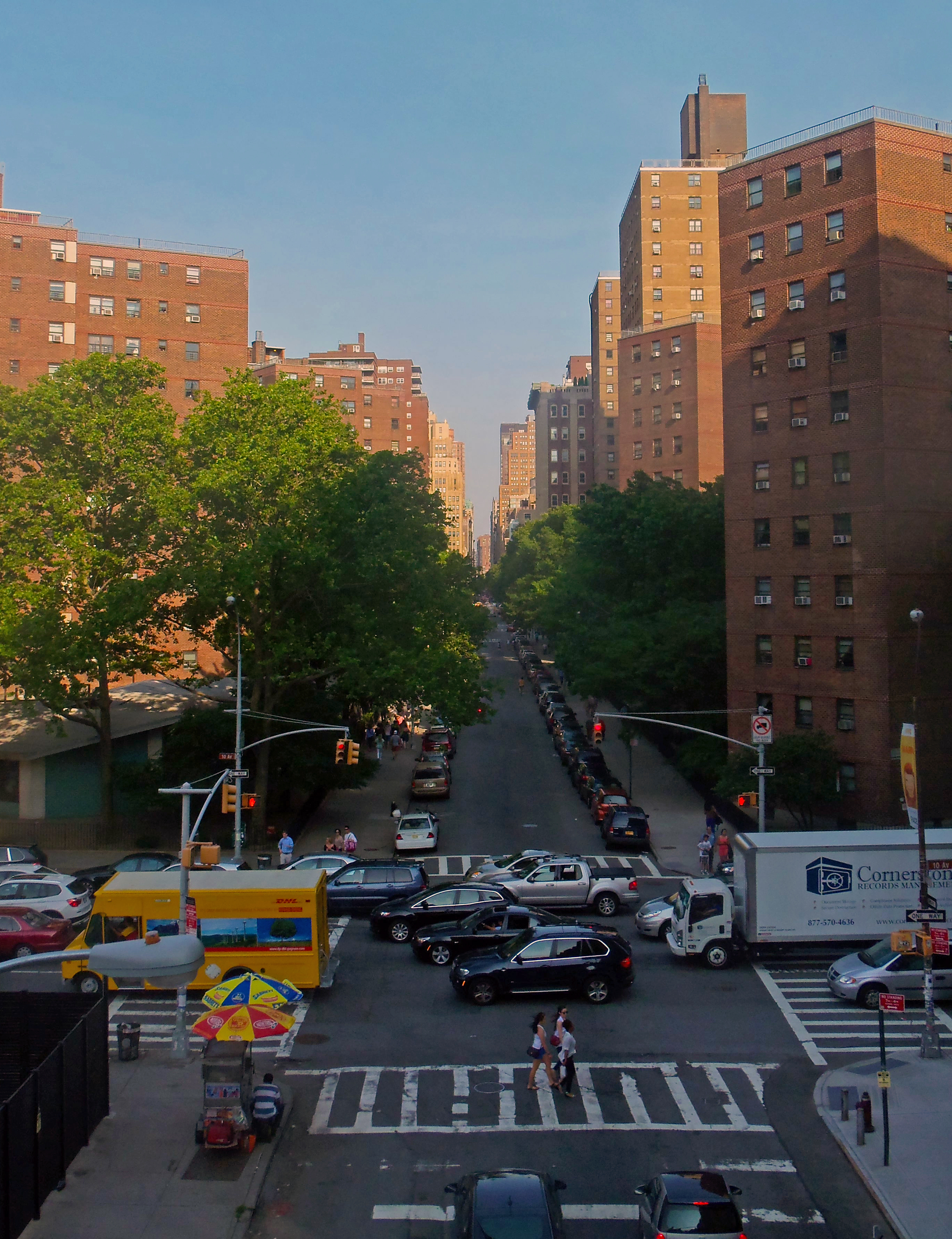
- Chelsea-Elliott Houses in 2013
- Interactive map of Chelsea-Elliott Houses
- Coordinates: 40.748880°N 74.001530°W
- Country: United States
- State: New York
- City: New York City
- Borough: Manhattan

Area
  - Total: 0.010 sq mi (0.026 km^{2})

Population
  - Total: 2,323
  - Density: 230,000/sq mi (90,000/km^{2})
- ZIP codes: 10001
- Area codes: 212, 332, 646, and 917
- Website: www.fultonelliottchelsea.com/home

The Elliott-Chelsea Houses is a combined housing project of the New York City Housing Authority (NYCHA), located between West 25th and 27th Streets and Ninth and Tenth Avenues in the Chelsea neighborhood of Manhattan, New York City. It consists of two contiguous projects which were originally separate but have been combined for administrative purposes: the John Lovejoy Elliott Houses, named after the founder of the Hudson Guild, has four 11- and 12-story buildings which accommodate over 1400 residents in 589 apartments. The Chelsea Houses has over 1,000 residents in 426 apartments within two 21-story buildings.

== History ==
Prior to development, the Elliott Houses were criticized by the United States Housing Authority who cited the land value being higher than other housing projects. NYCHA broke ground in December 1945 and were completed on July 15, 1947. Designed by William Lescaze, they were one of the first examples of high rise tower in the park style. The Chelsea Houses were designed by architect Paul L. Wood and construction started in 1961 and completed on May 31, 1964. The Chelsea Houses were aided by the state for $8.3 million. In 2012, NYCHA converted a parking lot in the development into a 168 unit building for low-to-middle-income households.

Development firms Related Companies and Essence Development proposed rebuilding the Elliott-Chelsea Houses and the nearby Fulton Houses in early 2023. In a survey in June 2023, residents of the Elliott-Chelsea Houses and Fulton Houses voted in favor of demolishing the existing towers and constructing a 3,500-unit apartment complex on the same site. At the time, NYCHA officials estimated that the complexes needed about $1 billion in repairs and that it would cost about as much to build new complexes on the site. PAU, COOKFOX Architects, and ILA were hired in early 2024 to design the Fulton Elliott-Chelsea Plan, which would involve converting 2,056 NYCHA apartments into mixed-income units. Under the plan, six new towers would be built on the two sites before the existing buildings were demolished. NYCHA's board approved the redevelopment of the Fulton Houses and Elliot-Chelsea Houses in November 2024. The proposed cost for the two projects had risen to $1.9 billion by early 2025. Opponents sued to prevent the demolition of the buildings; the lawsuit gained notice after the pro-se plaintiffs admitted to using generative AI in legal filings.

In 2025, PAU Architects discontinued their collaboration with Related because "no proper resident engagement was carried out". In December 2025, the project cost had escalated to $2.4 billion, with the price per unit reaching $1.2 million. Elderly residents also sued to pause the development, testifying that many residents had limited English proficiency and that it would be onerous for them to have to relocate twice. A state appeals court issued an injunction in March 2026, preventing further demolition temporarily. The injunction was lifted that July.

== Notable people ==
- Stephanie Andujar (born 1986), actor
- Antonio Fargas (born 1946), actor
- Whoopi Goldberg (born 1955), actor
- Wayans family (lived there in the 1970s and 1980s), comedians

== See also ==
- New York City Housing Authority
