= Fulton Houses =

Public housing development in Manhattan, New York

- NYCHA property
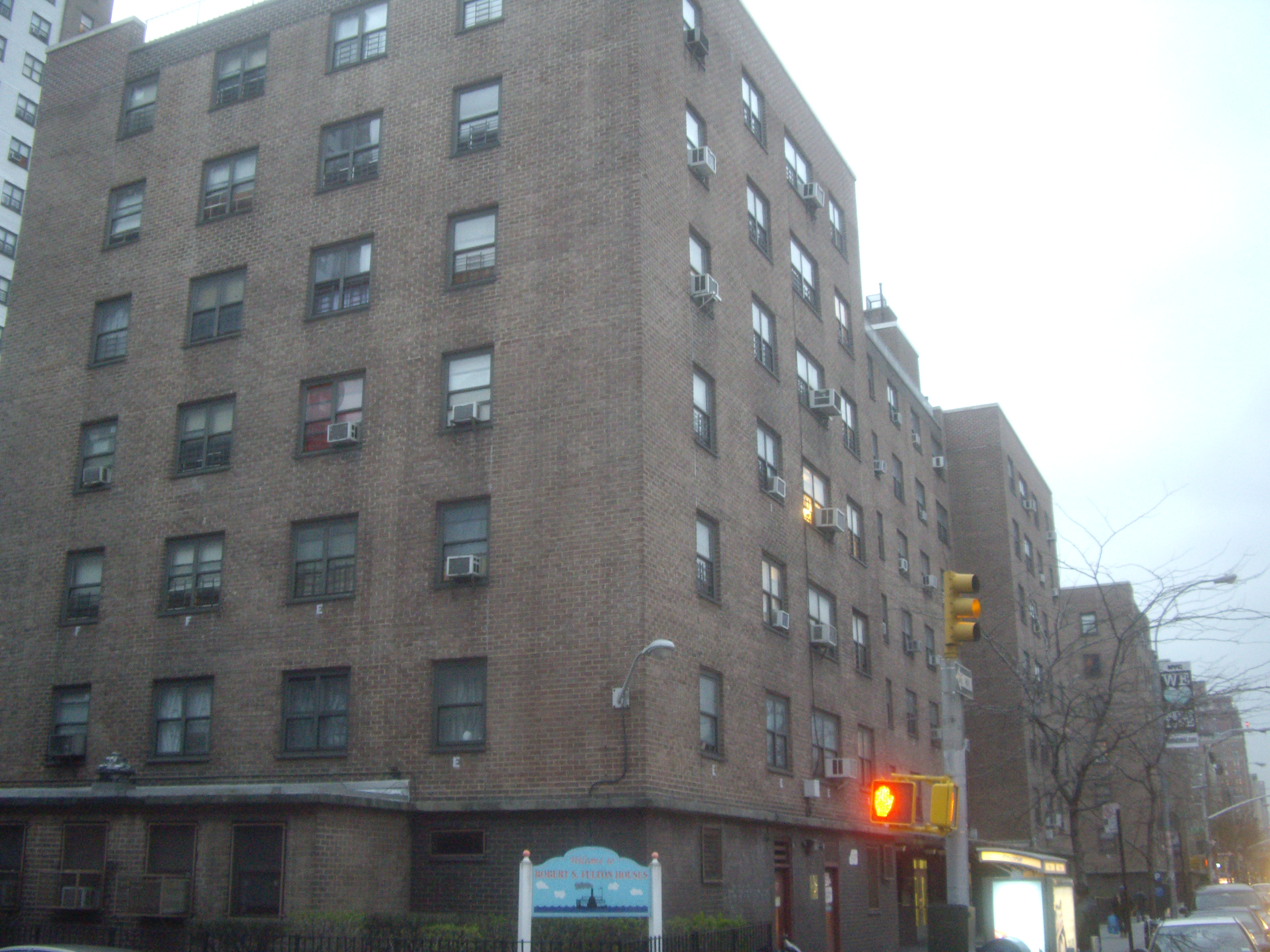
- Interactive map of Fulton Houses
- Coordinates: 40.74325°N 74.003972°W
- Country: United States
- State: New York
- City: New York City
- Borough: Manhattan

Area
  - Total: 0.009 sq mi (0.023 km^{2})

Population
  - Total: 2,175
  - Density: 240,000/sq mi (93,000/km^{2})
- ZIP codes: 10011
- Area codes: 212, 332, 646, and 917
- Website: my.nycha.info/DevPortal/

The Robert Fulton Houses are a public housing development located in the Chelsea neighborhood of Manhattan in New York City, owned and operated by the New York City Housing Authority (NYCHA). The 6.27-acre (2.54 ha) site is located between West 16th and 19th Streets and bound by Ninth and Tenth Avenues. The project consists of 945 apartments in eleven buildings; three buildings are 25 stories tall, and the remaining eight are 6 stories tall.

== History ==
The Robert Fulton Houses were designed by architects Brown & Guenther and were developed as a "vest pocket" site that retains the street grid. The groundbreaking ceremony was held on October 15, 1962 and the buildings were completed on March 31, 1965. It is served by the New York City Police Department's 10th Precinct.

The housing project is named after engineer and inventor Robert Fulton (1765-1815).

In 2019, amid NYCHA’s capital-repair backlog, the de Blasio administration considered working with private developers to redevelop parts of Fulton Houses. The development is located in a rapidly gentrifying neighborhood where median asking rent is $3,462. The plan proposed by the city includes demolishing and rebuilding two buildings and a parking garage in the housing project and replacing them with three larger buildings of which 70 percent would be market-rate and 30 percent would be “affordable enough” for current residents; and to turn over management to a private developer. Some residents opposed the proposal, arguing that public-housing tenants had limited input in land-use decisions, noting that previous conversions of public housing came with a 57 percent rent increase. Average monthly rent for residents is $660.

Development firms Related Companies and Essence Development proposed demolishing and then rebuilding this housing project and the nearby Chelsea-Elliott Houses in early 2023. In a survey in June 2023, residents of the Chelsea-Elliott Houses and Fulton Houses voted in favor of demolishing the existing towers and constructing a 3,500-unit apartment complex on the same site. At the time, NYCHA officials estimated that the complexes needed about $1 billion in repairs and that it would cost about as much to build new complexes on the site. PAU, COOKFOX Architects, and ILA were hired in early 2024 to design the Fulton Elliott-Chelsea Plan, which would involve converting 2,056 NYCHA apartments into mixed-income units. Under the plan, six new towers would be built on the two sites before the existing buildings were demolished. NYCHA's board approved the redevelopment of the Fulton Houses and Elliot-Chelsea Houses in November 2024. The proposed cost for the two projects had risen to $1.9 billion by early 2025. Opponents sued to prevent the demolition of the buildings; the lawsuit gained notice after their lawyers were caught using generative AI in legal filings.

== Demography ==
In 2025, NYCHA reported that Fulton Houses included 581 senior apartments, 63 households with a child under age six, 260 households with children aged 6 to 17, 391 single-person households, and 121 households with four or more people.

== Notable people ==
- Shawn Wayans (born 1971), actor
- Marlon Wayans (born 1972), actor and comedian
- Keenan Ivory Wayans
- Damon Wayans
- Kim Wayans

== See also ==
- New York City Housing Authority
