= Hudson Guild =

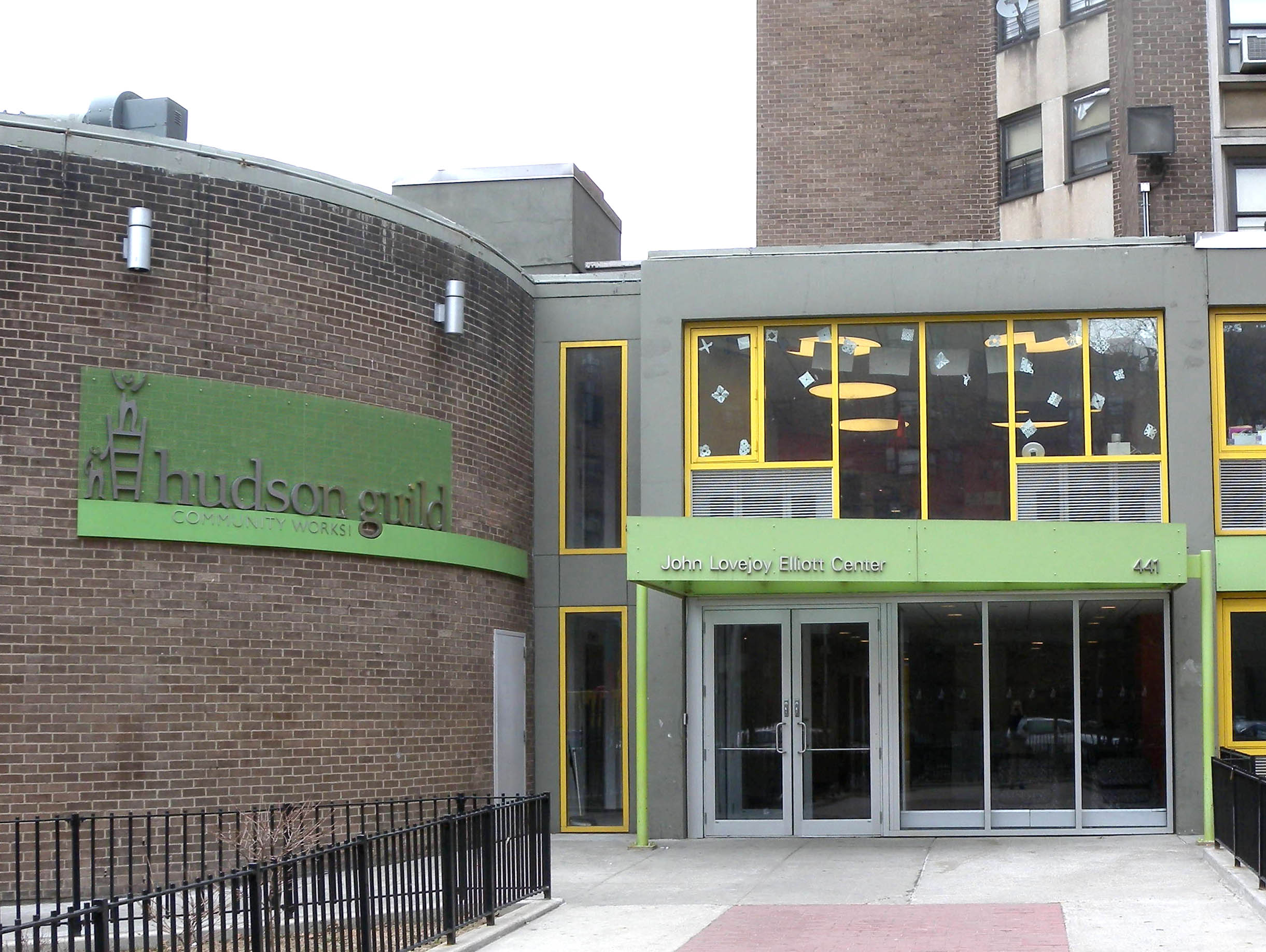
The Hudson Guild's Elliott Center on West 26th Street between Ninth and Tenth Avenues, located within the New York City Housing Authority's Chelsea-Elliot Houses development.

The Hudson Guild is a community-based social services organization rooted in and primarily focused on the Chelsea neighborhood of Manhattan, New York City. It was founded in 1897 by Dr. John Lovejoy Elliott as a settlement house, with the intention of helping to alleviate the problems of the immigrant community of Chelsea's industrial area. The Guild continues to provide a variety of programs and services, including after-school care, professional counselling and community arts programs to the neighborhood.

== History ==
In 1895, John Lovejoy Elliott, a young man greatly influenced by the growing settlement house and Ethical Culture movements, planted the seed for what became the Hudson Guild, organizing the "Hurly Burlies," a social and recreation club for young men in the Chelsea neighborhood. In the next few years, Elliott established numerous clubs and programs for other groups, including young boys and girls, working women, and families. Elliott's disparate programs merged in 1897 to become the Hudson Guild, which provided a platform to organize residents to improve neighborhood living conditions. Elliott’s son-in-law, H. Daniel Carpenter, followed him as head of Hudson Guild. Carpenter was executive director during a crucial period, from 1943 until 1973 and introduced or expanded programs for returning veterans, low and middle income housing, job training, and early childhood education.

Among the Guild's early advocacy successes were lobbying for the New York State Tenement House Act in 1901, the creation of Chelsea Park, the first recreational space in the area in 1907, and the approval of new, low-cost, city-funded housing in Chelsea in 1938. At the same time, the Guild offered a broad range of direct programming and services to Chelsea residents, opening the first free kindergarten in New York City in 1897, starting the first Summer Play School in the city in 1917, opening dental, prenatal, and well-baby clinics in 1919-1921, founding the Elliott Neighbors Club for Senior Citizens in 1947, opening one of the city’s first community mental health clinics in 1948, and the first offerings of English-as-a-Second-Language classes in 1950.

In 1966 the Guild advocated for anti-poverty programs, including Neighborhood Youth Corps, VISTA and Head Start, and worked with other settlement houses and the city to merge Head Start and daycare in 1993. It founded the Chelsea Community-Supported Agriculture co-op in 2000 and in 2005 successfully advocated for affordable housing inclusion in West Chelsea redevelopment plans.

In 2007, the Hudson Guild was among over 530 New York City arts and social service institutions to receive part of a $20 million grant from the Carnegie Corporation, which was made possible through a donation by New York City mayor Michael Bloomberg.

== Programs ==
Each year, Hudson Guild provides a service for over 14,000 people. Hudson Guild has five main program areas: Children and Youth Services, Adult Services, Arts Program, Community Building, and Mental Health.

Hudson Guild’s Children and Youth Services targets at-risk youth living in Chelsea and surrounding neighborhoods. Hudson Guild works with other organizations and initiatives, such as non-profit Slideluck Potshow's Slideluck Youth Initiative (SLYI). The Guild’s Arts Program operates a theatre and two galleries. The Guild's Mental Health program provides a range of services to meet the mental health needs of residents of Chelsea and surrounding neighborhoods, including group and individual therapy through a licensed mental health clinic; school-based mental health services to a local elementary school; and programs for at-risk youth.
