= Peter McManus Cafe =

Bar in New York City

Coordinates: 40°44′31″N 73°59′51″W

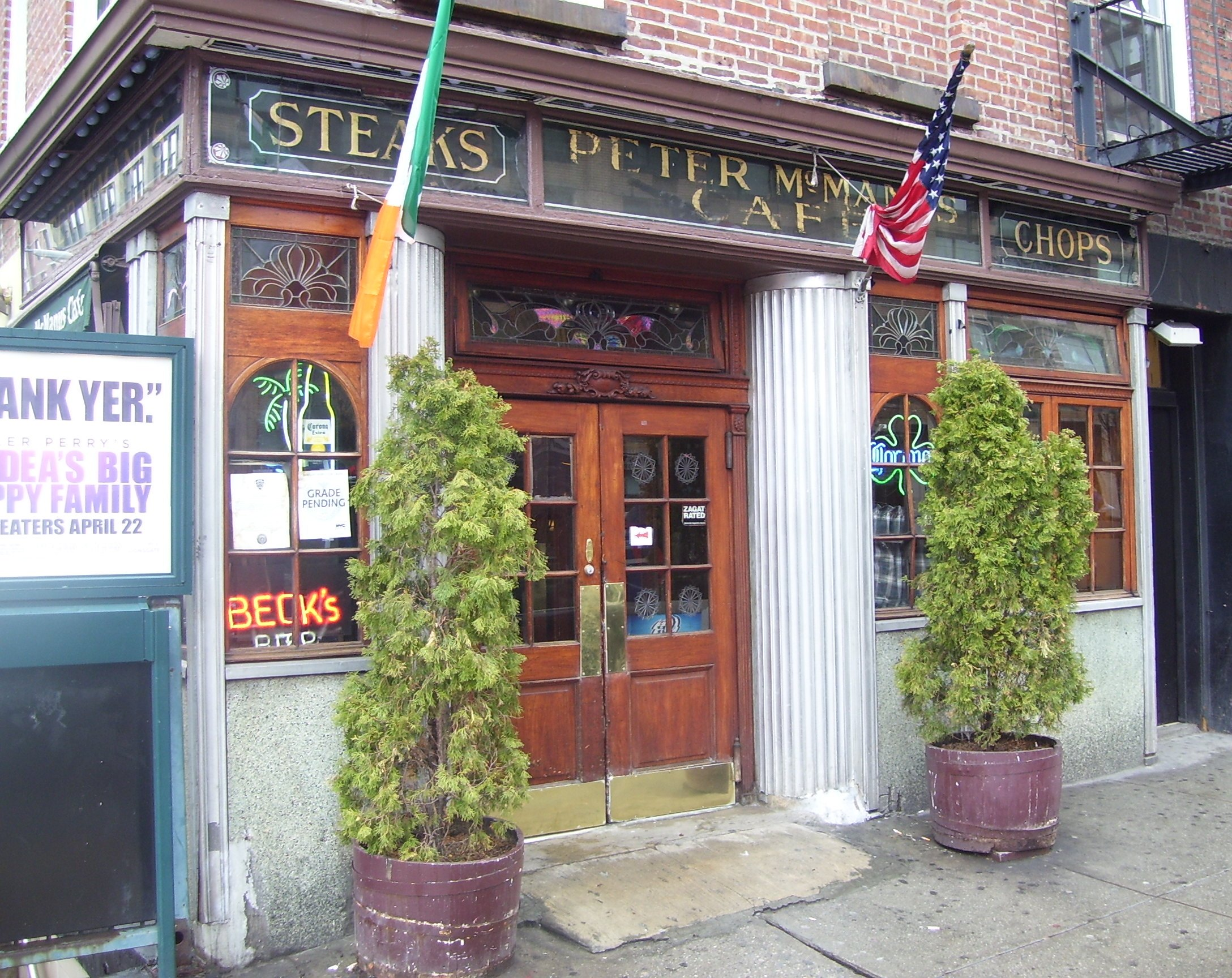
The entrance to Peter McManus Cafe

The Peter McManus Café is among the oldest family-owned and operated bars in New York City. It opened in 1936 and is located at 152 Seventh Avenue on the corner of West 19th Street in the Chelsea neighborhood of Manhattan. The bar has been Zagat-rated and written about in numerous articles, and appeared in the book The Hundred Best Bars in NYC with a high rating. The bar has also received several awards. The current proprietor is James Justin McManus.

== In popular culture ==
McManus' has been featured in a number of films and television programs, including Highlander, Radio Days, Keeping the Faith, Seinfeld, Law & Order and Saturday Night Live. It was also featured in a portion of the 2010 film The Other Guys.
