= Silas Seandel =

New York based furniture sculptor

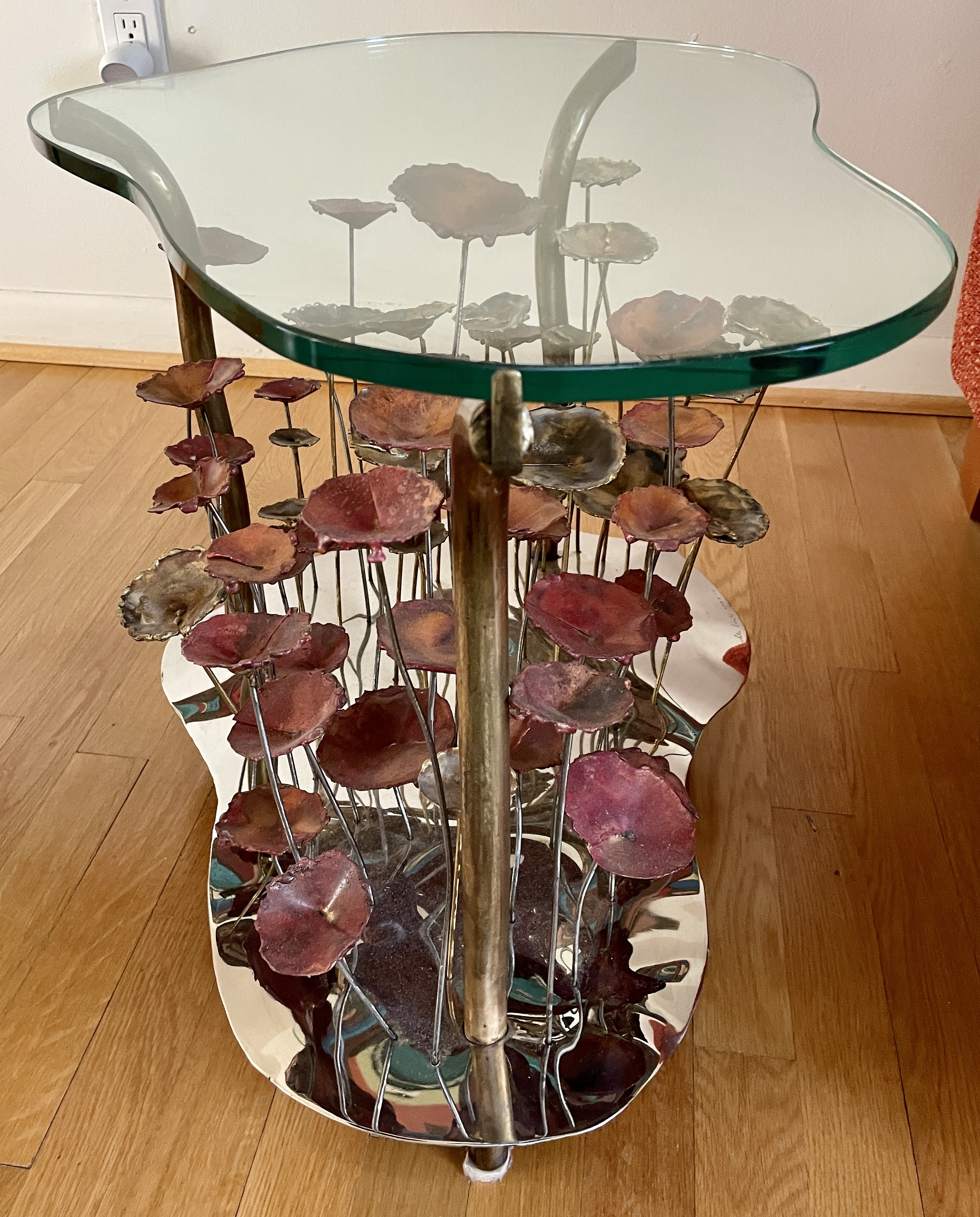
Silas Seandel, "Reflected Poppies" end table, 2011, 19" high with 22-23" free form glass (private collection)

Silas Seandel (born August 11, 1937) is an American furniture sculptor based in New York City.

Seandel was born in New York City and studied sculpture and economics at the University of Pennsylvania. He graduated in 1950 and opened a studio in 1963, and for over 40 years has commissioned creative pieces of functional art, or sculptured furniture.

Seandel has been profiled by a number of publications during his career, including Interior Design magazine in 1982 (Vol. 53, Issue 12) and Hudson Magazine in 2008 (Vol. 4 Issue 1, 2008). He was also profiled in a chapter of Modern Americana: Studio Furniture From High Craft to High Glam by Julies Iovine and Todd Merill (Rizzoli 2008), describing him as one of the premier metal sculptors in the United States in the late 20th century.

Seandel's works are all handmade in his studio located in the Chelsea neighborhood of Manhattan. He uses solid metals such as brass, bronze, steel, copper, etc. There are no enamels, no veneers, or unnatural materials, and all colors are the results of acids and heat treatments which Seandel has developed.
