= London Terrace =

Apartment building complex in Manhattan, New York

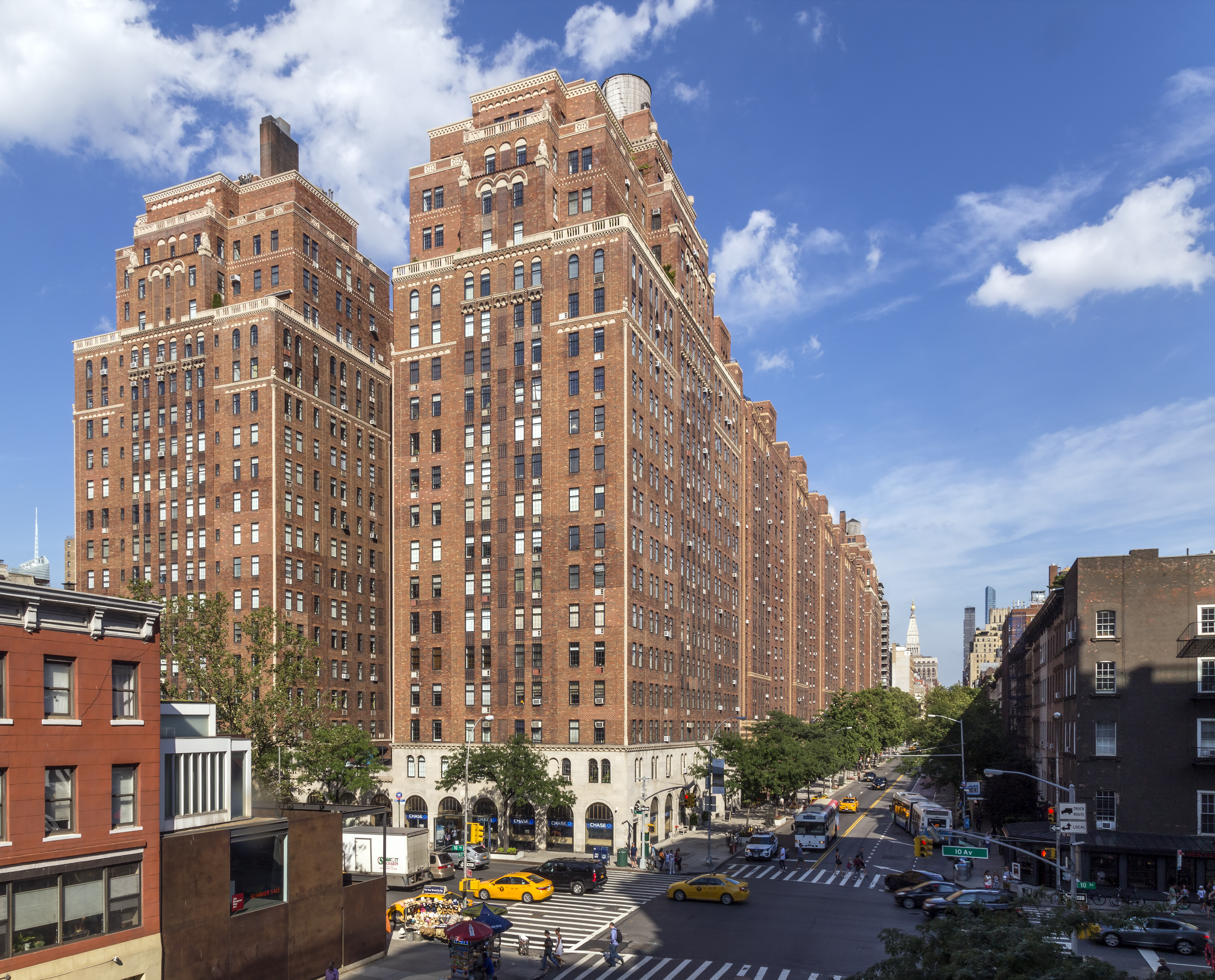

General information
- Location: Chelsea, Manhattan, New York City, United States
- Coordinates: 40°44′50″N 74°0′7″W
- Opened: 1930

Design and construction
- Architecture firm: Farrar & Watmough

London Terrace is an apartment building complex in the Chelsea neighborhood of Manhattan in New York City. It occupies an entire city block on Manhattan's West Side, bounded by Ninth Avenue to the east, Tenth Avenue to the west, 23rd Street to the south, and 24th Street to the north. Construction began in late 1929 and cost more than $25 million (equivalent to $468,750,000 in 2025) on what was to be the largest apartment buildings in the world.

London Terrace has about 1,700 apartments in 14 contiguous buildings of 17 to 19 stories, and an Olympic-sized swimming pool. The complex was built by Henry Mandel Companies and the architectural firm Farrar & Watmough. The building is operated by two entities: London Terrace Towers is a co-op and managed by Douglas Elliman Property Management; London Terrace Gardens is a rental building, managed by Rose Associates.

== History ==
The name of the building stems from the former development also known as London Terrace, which consisted of roughly 80 houses resembling London flats. These were built in 1845 by Alexander Jackson Davis. The location was selected by investor Henry Mandel due to the short walk to midtown Manhattan offices, as a way to provide modern low-priced housing for white-collar workers. Victor C. Farrar, architect of London Terrace, compared the project to Rockefeller Center, and stated that large-scale projects conserve valuable space and rehabilitate the city with modern apartment buildings and stores.

Descendants of Clement Clarke Moore leased the property to Mandel in 1929, which permitted the demolition of the six-story "London Terrace" buildings and the smaller "Chelsea Cottage" in the rear, which were mostly constructed in 1845, after their 85-year leases expired. Mandel stated that "The section which we will develop is one of the most logical areas in downtown section for the purpose... here may be found about the only unbroken rows of old-style buildings which lend themselves readily to destruction without the interference of newer structures. The convenience of the section to the midtown and shopping centers offers another logical reason for such development". The cornerstone was laid by Clement Clarke Moore, great-great-grandson of his namesake, in December 1929. To finance construction of the complex, two separate $5.5 million bonds were issued, one for the "End Units" (now London Terrace Towers) and one for the "Garden Units" (now London Terrace Gardens), which leads to the buildings' bifurcated structure. The first buildings were opened for occupancy May 1930.

When the complex was complete in November 1930, the population of the block increased from approximately 400 to roughly 5,000, making better use of the valuable real estate. The complex included restaurants, swimming pool, gymnasium, and a "modernistic garage with club rooms for both patrons and chauffeurs". The pool was regularly used for swim meets. An internal dial telephone system connected the apartments and businesses in the complex.

At the 1932 London Terrace Christmas party, Yankees baseball legend Babe Ruth dressed as Santa Claus and distributed gifts to hundreds of children. Some guests were residents of London Terrace, while others were invited by The Salvation Army. After handing out the gifts, Babe revealed his identity to wild shouts and cheers from the crowd. Babe and his wife thrilled the crowd by signing autographs and visiting apartments.

The building fell into default in May 1933, shortly after the complex was complete, due in part to the Great Depression. Henry Mandel entered into personal bankruptcy in 1932 with debts of more than $14 million (equivalent to $330,366,000 in 2025).

Three years after completion, on January 1, 1934, it was 94% rented (1,560 out of 1,665). The property agent, William A. White & Sons credited this to four factors: the opening of the Independent Subway System's Eighth Avenue Line station at 23rd Street (hosting the current A, C, and E trains of the New York City Subway); lowered rental prices; advertising campaigns; and addition of facilities available to residents without charge.

== Description ==
The London Terrace building contains approximately 1,700 apartments in 14 contiguous buildings of between 17 and 19 stories, and was constructed by Henry Mandel Companies and architectural firm Farrar & Watmough. On the outside, the building still appears to be one large complex, but it is operated on the inside as two separate organizations, London Terrace Towers and London Terrace Gardens; many of the internal connections have been closed off. All London Terrace residents are still able to enjoy amenities such as the swimming pool, health club, roof deck, and internal garden. However, whether the swimming pool at London Terrace is included in the rent has been disputed since 1992. In c. 2011, both the Gardens and the Towers have invested significant sums to modernize and repair the building.

London Terrace is situated very close to the High Line and within less than 1 mile (1.6 km) of Penn Station, Chelsea Market, Chelsea Piers, and the Hudson River Park.

== Notable residents ==
- Chelsea Clinton, journalist, daughter of Bill and Hillary Clinton
- Malcolm Gladwell, Canadian journalist, author, public speaker and thinker
- Carla Gugino, actress
- Tim Gunn of Project Runway
- Sebastián Gutiérrez, Venezuelan film director, screenwriter and film producer
- Debbie Harry, singer in the band Blondie, actress
- Chris Kattan, member of the Saturday Night Live cast and actor
- Catherine Keener, actress
- Mark Kriegel, sportswriter with the newspapers The New York Daily News and New York Post
- Diane Kruger, German-American actress
- Annie Leibovitz, celebrity photographer
- Bridget Moynahan, actress
- John O'Hara, author
- Adam Pally, actor
- Kate Pierson, keyboardist and singer with the B-52's
- Christine Quinn, Democratic politician, former Speaker of the New York City Council
- Milos Raonic, tennis player
- Rob Shuter, entertainment columnist
- Susan Sontag, essayist
- Bruce Sussman, songwriter
- Tom Verlaine, singer, songwriter, guitarist and pianist, front man of Television
