= John Lovejoy Elliott =

Dr John Lovejoy Elliott
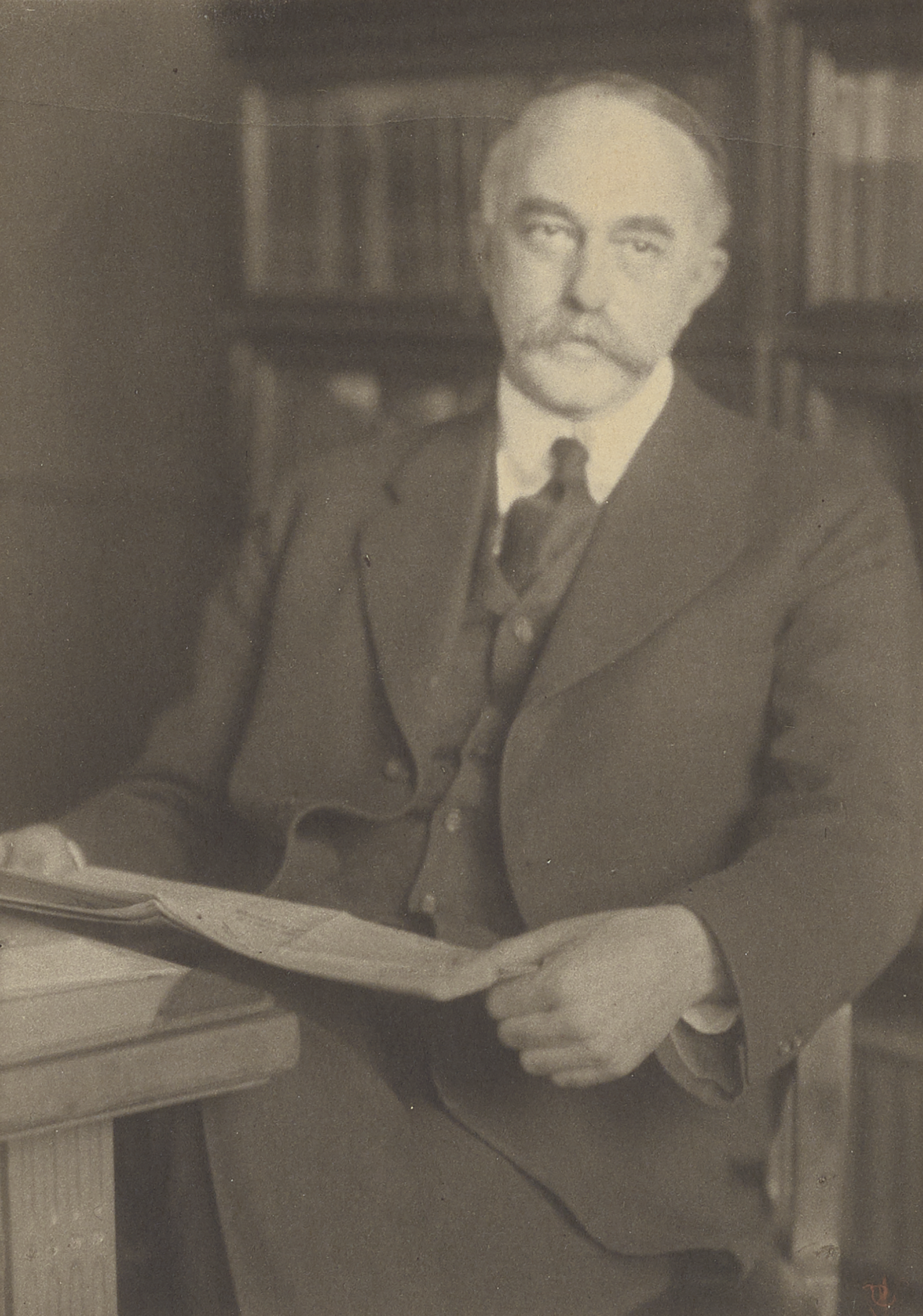
- Born: December 2, 1868; Princeton, Illinois
- Died: April 12, 1942 (aged 73); Manhattan, New York
- Education: Cornell University
- Employer: New York Society for Ethical Culture
- Organization(s): Hudson Guild (founder); American Civil Liberties Union (founding member)
- Movement: Ethical Culture

John Lovejoy Elliott (2 December 1868 — 12 April 1942) was an American social work leader, Ethical Culture pioneer, founder of the Hudson Guild, and founding member of the American Civil Liberties Union (ACLU).

== Early life and education ==
John Lovejoy Elliott was born in Princeton, Illinois, to Elizabeth (née Denham) and Isaac Hughes Elliott. His mother was the stepdaughter of Owen Lovejoy. His father, a former captain in the 33d Illinois Regiment during the Civil War, was a friend of Robert Ingersoll. Under the influence of his parents, Elliott developed a love of learning and gained familiarity with the writings of Thomas Paine and Voltaire.

Elliott studied at Cornell University, where he was elected president of the senior class, and graduated in 1892. At Cornell, he came into contact with Felix Adler, founder of the Ethical Culture movement, and later with Stanton Coit, another Ethical Culturist. Having developed an interest in the movement and its reformist aspirations, Elliott went to Germany to study at the University of Halle. There, he wrote his doctoral dissertation "Prisons as Reformatories."

== Ethical Culture and Hudson Guild ==
In 1894, Elliott became Adler's assistant at the New York Society for Ethical Culture. In this role, he taught, organized, and lectured for the society, coming into contact with the artistic, social, and political milieu of New York, as well as its urban poor. Witnessing the conditions under which they lived, and the lack of cultural opportunities available to them, in 1895 Elliott founded the Hudson Guild in Chelsea, which was to become prominent in the social work activity of New York City.

The Guild included boys’ clubs, a kindergarten for the children of working mothers, and an employment bureau for unskilled women. There was also a printshop for training children as apprentices, a cooperative store, and a model tenement on West 28th Street. Working with the Child Study Federation, Hudson guild enrolled 200 students in the first all-day summer play school in the city. It went on to sponsor outdoor movies in summer, sports, crafts, music, science, citizenship courses, and trips to museums and libraries. Elliott believed in the importance of developing "the latent social power in the men and women, the boys and the girls", encouraging Chelsea residents to participate in the running of guild activities.

When Adler died in 1933, Elliott became leader of the New York Society for Ethical Culture. He lectured, taught ethics classes, and conducted marriages and funerals for the society.

== Wider reform ==
Through his work with the Hudson Guild, Elliott became one of New York City's leading figures in social reform. He was a signatory to the petition for the founding of the National Association for the Advancement of Colored People (NAACP), and in 1920 helped to establish the American Civil Liberties Union in 1920, remaining active on its board until his death.

Among the wider causes Elliott endorsed were mothers’ pensions, juvenile courts, and prison reform during the New Deal. In 1938, he founded the Good Neighbor Committee, of which he became chairman. This group assisted refugees, particularly those fleeing Nazi oppression, to find work and support in America. Also in 1938, at a lunch held to mark Elliott's 70th birthday, Mayor La Guardia praised him for "constant public service during his lifetime," and stated that "We could not have lived through such periods as this in this country without such leadership as that of Dr. Elliott".

Elliott was chairman of the National Federation of Settlements 1919-23, and a member of the State Committee on Education, as well as the New York City Council of Social Agencies. During his lifetime, Elliott was described as "one of the great social workers and spiritual leaders of our time... a kind of lay saint".

== Death and legacy ==
John Lovejoy Elliott died on 12 April 1942 in Mount Sinai Hospital, aged 73. The New York Times remembered him as "one of the nation's leaders in the fight for better housing and public health facilities".

A biography, titled Ministry to Man: The Life of John Lovejoy Elliott, by Tay Hohoff, was published in 1959.

Papers linked to Elliott's life and works are in various collections at the Social Welfare Historical Archives Center, University of Minnesota.

Ellen Salzman-Fiske has suggested that, while often overshadowed by his female contemporaries:

one could argue that it is Elliott who created and put into practice a settlement house that best addressed the needs of immigrants and most helped the immigrant underclass achieve some independence and political power.
