= List of public housing developments in the United States =

This is a list of developments of public housing in the United States.

== Arizona ==
- Phoenix, Arizona
  - Coffelt-Lamoreaux Homes (1953)

== Arkansas ==
- Little Rock, Arkansas
  - Jesse Powell Tower
  - Sunset Terrace Housing Units
  - Cumberland Tower
  - Hollinsworth Grove
  - Parris Tower
  - Highland Court
  - Amaelia B. Ives Homes
  - Booker Homes
- Osceola, Arkansas

== California ==
- Anaheim
  - Lincoln Anaheim Phase II
- Bakersfield
  - Oro Vista
- Compton
  - Lutheran Gardens Apartments
  - New Wilmington Arms
- East Palo Alto
  - Light Tree Apartments
- Long Beach
  - Carmelitos Housing Project
- Los Angeles
  - Avalon Gardens, Florence
  - Estrada Courts, Boyle Heights
  - Gonzaque Village, Watts
  - Imperial Courts, Watts
  - Jordan Downs, Watts
  - Lorena Plaza - construction cost (2020) = $750,000 / unit
  - Mar Vista Gardens, Del Rey
  - Morgan Place, Crenshaw
  - Nickerson Gardens, Watts
  - Pueblo Del Rio, Central-Alameda
  - Pueblo del Sol, Boyle Heights
  - Rainbow Apartments, Skid Row
  - Ramona Gardens, Boyle Heights
  - Rancho San Pedro, San Pedro
  - Rose Hill Courts, Rose Hills
  - San Fernando Gardens, Pacoima
  - Summit View Apartments - Sylmar, Los Angeles - construction cost (2020) = $740,000 / unit
  - William Mead Homes, Chinatown
- Marin City
  - Golden Gate Village
- Oakland
  - Acorn Projects, West Oakland
  - Lockwood Gardens, East Oakland
  - Campbell Village Court, West Oakland
  - Cypress Village, West Oakland
- Pittsburg
  - El Pueblo, West Pittsburg
- Richmond
  - Las Deltas, North Richmond
  - Nystrum Village, South Richmond
  - Richmond Village (formally known as Easter Hill), South Richmond
  - Triangle Court, Iron Triangle, Central Richmond
- Rodeo
  - Bayo Vista
- Sacramento
  - New Helvetia
  - Seavey Circle, also known as Marina Vista
- San Diego
  - Meadowbrook Apartments
  - President John Adams Manor
  - Sea Breeze Gardens, formerly known as the Bay Vista Apartments
- San Francisco
  - Alice Griffith Projects (colloquially "Double Rock"), Bayview
  - Alemany Homes, Bernal Heights
  - Holly Courts, Bernal Heights
  - Hunters View Dwellings, Hunters Point
  - Hunters Point East/West, Hunters Point
  - La Salle Apartments, Hunters Point
  - Kirkwood, Hunters Point
  - Osceola Lane, Hunters Point
  - Northridge Dwellings, Hunters Point
  - Oakdale Projects, Hunters Point
  - Westpoint Projects, Hunters Point
  - Army Street Projets (Bernal Dwellings), Mission
  - Valencia Gardens, Mission
  - 200 Randolph, Lakeview
  - Clementina Towers, South of Market
  - 350 Ellis, Tenderloin
  - JFK Towers, Pacific Heights
  - Potrero Annex and Terrace, Potrero Hill
  - Ping Yuen, Chinatown
  - Great Highway Apartments, Sunset
  - Hayes Valley Apartments, Western Addition
  - Joan San Jules, Western Addition
  - Friendship Village, Western Addition
  - Martin Luther King/Marcus Garvey Square Apartments, Western Addition
  - Robert Pitts Homes, Western Addition
  - Westside Courts, Western Addition
  - Yerba Buena Plaza Annex (colloquially "Pink Palace"), Western Addition (no longer active)
  - Yerba Buena Plaza East, Western Addition
  - North Beach Place, North Beach
  - Geneva Towers, Visitacion Valley (demolished)
  - Sunnydale Housing Projects, Visitacion Valley
- Stockton
  - Almond View Apartments

== Colorado ==
- Denver
  - 1040 Osage Street
  - 655 Broadway
  - Arapahoe Plaza
  - Barney Ford
  - Casa Loma
  - Columbine Homes
  - Connole Apartments
  - Dispersed East
  - Dispersed South
  - Dispersed West
  - Eliot Elderly
  - Goldsmith Village
  - GreenHaus
  - Hirschfeld Towers
  - Lincoln Park
  - Mariposa VIII
  - Mountain View
  - Mulroy Apartments
  - North Lincoln Park
  - North Lincoln Park Mid-Rise
  - Pancratia Hall
  - Platte Valley Homes
  - Studebaker Lofts
  - Syracuse Plaza
  - Tapiz at Mariposa
  - Thomas Bean Towers
  - Thrive
  - Walsh Manor
  - Westridge Homes
  - Westwood Homes
  - Vida at Sloans
- Grand Junction
  - 2814 Patterson Rd
  - Arbor Vista
  - Crystal Brook Townhomes
  - Linden Pointe
  - Village Park Apartments
- Pueblo
  - Eastwood Heights
  - Mesa Tower Apartments
  - Minnequa Park Apartments
  - Hyde Park
  - Sangre de Cristo Apts
  - The Vail Hotel

== Connecticut ==
- Bridgeport
  - Charles F. Greene Homes
  - P.T. Barnum Apartments
  - Trumbull Gardens
- Norwalk
  - Washington Village
- Waterbury
  - Berkeley Heights
- Willamantic

Father Honan Terrace

== Florida ==
- Boca Raton
  - Dixie Manor
- Hialeah
  - La Esperanza
  - Milander Manor
  - Raul A. Martinez
  - Ruth A. Tinsman Pavilion
  - Vernon Ashley Plaza
  - Dale G. Bennett Villas
  - Donald F. Scott Villas
  - Hoffman Gardens
  - Holland Hall
  - James Bright Villas
  - Villa Mariposa
  - Vivian Villas
- Miami
  - Edison Courts
  - Edison Park
  - Culmer Projects
  - Scott Carver Housing Project (demolished)
  - Liberty Square
  - Lincoln Field Apartments
  - Brown Subs
  - Arthur Mays Villas
  - Pine Island I & II
  - Goulds Plaza
  - Goulds New Homes
  - Southridge (The Square) I & II
  - Richmond Homes
  - Perrine Gardens
  - Perrine Villas
  - Perrine Rainbow
  - Naranja(Sunset Pointe)
  - Modello
  - South Miami Housing
  - Grove Homes
  - Little Havana Homes
  - Joe Moretti Apartments
  - Culmer Gardens
  - Gwen Cherry (The Numbers)
  - Donn Gardens
  - Townpark
  - Annie Coleman Homes
  - Victory Homes
  - New Haven Gardens
  - Little River Terrace
  - Homestead Gardens
  - Rainbow village
- Tampa
  - Robles Park
  - North Boulevard Homes (demolished)
  - Central Park Village (demolished)
  - Ponce De Leon (demolished)
  - College Hill Homes (demolished)
  - Moses White (demolished)
  - Rembrandt Gardens
- Jacksonville
  - Victoria Lakes
  - Lincoln Court
  - Courtney Maynord
  - HollyBrook
- West Palm Beach
  - Dunbar Village

== Georgia ==
- Athens (Athens Housing Authority)
  - Parkview Homes
  - Broadacres Homes
  - Parkview Extension
  - Rocksprings Homes
  - Hancock Apartments
  - Hill & Chase Street Apartments
  - Herman & Vine Street Apartments
  - Vine/Arch Street Apartments
  - Dublin/East Broad Street Apartments
  - Athens/Atlanta Avenue Apartments
  - Jack R. Wells Homes
  - Vine Circle Apartments
  - Nellie B. Homes
  - College & Hoyt Street Apartments
  - Jessie B. Denney Tower
  - Bonnie Lane Apartments
  - Towne View Place
  - ACT I Homes (AHA's Homeownership Program)
  - Savannah Heights Neighborhood
- Atlanta (Atlanta Housing Authority)
  - Techwood Homes
  - Bankhead Courts
  - Bowen Homes
  - Clark Howell
  - Palmer House
  - Roosevelt House
  - University Homes
  - John Hope Homes
  - Hidden Village Homes
  - Capitol Homes
  - Grady Homes
  - Antoine Graves
  - Eagan Homes
  - Alonzo F. Herndon Homes
  - Carver Homes
  - Harris Homes
  - John O. Chiles
  - Perry Homes
  - McDaniel-Glenn
  - Hollywood Court
  - Thomasville Heights
  - Gilbert Gardens/Poole Creek
  - Leila Valley
  - Englewood Manor
  - Eastlake Meadows
  - Jonesboro North
  - Jonesboro South
  - U-Rescue Villa
  - Kimberly Courts
  - Barge Road
  - Martin St Plaza
  - Westminster
  - Cosby Spear Memorial Tower
  - Hightower Manor
  - Juniper & 10th Highrise
  - Marian Road Highrise
  - Marietta Road Highrise
  - Cheshire Bridge Road Highrise
  - East Lake Highrise
  - Georgia Avenue Highrise
  - Hightower Manor
  - Peachtree Road Highrise
  - Piedmont Road Highrise
- Augusta
  - Lake Olmstead Homes
  - Cherry Tree Crossing
  - Oak Pointe
  - Allen Homes
  - MM Scott Barton Village
  - Dogwood Terrace
  - Gilbert Manor (demolished)
  - Underwood Homes (demolished)
- College Park
  - Boat Rock
  - Red Oak
- Decatur
  - Allen Wilson Terrace
  - Swanton Heights
  - Spring Point
  - Oakview
  - Gateway
- East Point
  - Hillcrest Homes
  - Creekside
  - OJ Hurt
  - Martail Homes
  - Washington Carver Homes
- Hinesville
  - Mission Ridge
  - Pineland
  - Regency
- Marietta
  - Fort-Hill Homes
  - Clay Homes
  - Louisville (housing development)
  - Boston homes (housing development)
- Savannah
  - Yamacraw Village

== Hawaii ==
- Oahu
  - Mayor wright homes
  - Kuhio park terrace
  - Kuhio homes
  - Kalihi valley homes (known as kam IV housing)
  - Halawa Housing (Puuwai Momi)
  - Wahiawa terrace
  - Palolo valley homes
  - Palolo homes
  - Puahala homes
  - Kaahumanu homes
  - Kamehameha homes
  - Maili I & II
- Maui
  - Kahekili terrace (A&B) (known as uphousing & downhousing)
- Big Island
  - Lokahi
  - Lanakila
  - Halealoha
  - Riverside

== Illinois ==
- Chicago (Chicago Housing Authority)
  - ABLA (Demolition completed 2007)
  - Altgeld Gardens (Renovated 2014)
  - Bridgeport Homes (Renovated 2008)
  - Cabrini–Green (William Green Homes Demolition completed May 2011; Frances Cabrini rowhouses remain)
  - Dearborn Homes (Renovated 2009)
  - Harold Ickes Homes (Demolition completed 2011)
  - Harrison Courts (Renovated 2009)
  - Henry Horner Homes (Demolition completed 2008)
  - Ida B. Wells Homes (Demolition completed August 2011)
  - Julia C. Lathrop Homes (Under renovation; NRHP listed in 2012)
  - Lake Parc Place/Lake Michigan High-rises (Lake Michigan High-rises demolished; Lake Parc Place renovated)
  - Lawndale Gardens (Renovated 2008)
  - LeClaire Courts (demolished 2010)
  - Lowden Homes (Renovated 2008)
  - Prairie Courts (demolished 2001)
  - Racine Courts (Renovated 2009)
  - Raymond Hilliard Homes (Renovated 2006)
  - Robert Taylor Homes (Demolition completed March 2007)
  - Rockwell Gardens (Demolition completed 2006)
  - Stateway Gardens (Demolition completed June 2007)
  - Trumbull Park Homes (Renovated 2008)
  - Wentworth Gardens (Renovated 2009)
  - Washington Park Homes (demolished 2002)
- Peoria
  - Taft Homes
  - Harrison Homes
  - Sterling Towers
  - RiverWest

== Indiana ==
- Indianapolis
  - Mozel Sander Projects
  - Park Lafayette
  - Lockefield Gardens
  - Blackburn Terrace Projects (aka Baltimore Projects due to its location on Baltimore Avenue)
  - Beechwood Gardens Apartments
  - Hawthorne Place
  - Rowney Terrace
  - Twin Hills Projects
  - Stone Key Apartments
- Muncie
  - Parkview Apartments
  - Munsyana Homes

== Kansas ==
- Lawrence Douglas County Housing Authority
- Kansas City
  - Chalet Manor
  - Rosedale Towers
  - St Margaret's Park
- Topeka
  - Deer Creek Village
  - Echo Ridge
  - Jackson Towers
  - Marshall Square
  - Pine Ridge Manor
  - Polk Plaza
  - Tennessee Town I and II
  - Tyler Towers
  - Western Plaza

== Kentucky ==
- Covington
  - Latonia Terrace
  - Golden Tower
  - Academy Flats
  - New Site Properties
  - Rivers Edge at Eastside Point
  - Eastside Revitalization
- Lexington
  - Bluegrass-Aspendale
  - Charlotte Court
  - Wilson St.
- Louisville
  - Beecher Terrace
  - Clarksdale Housing Complex
  - Cotter Homes
  - Iroquois homes
  - Southwick Homes

== Louisiana ==
- New Orleans (See Housing Authority of New Orleans)
  - St. Thomas Projects
  - Desire Projects
  - Florida Projects
  - Magnolia Projects
  - Melpomene Projects
  - Calliope Projects
  - Iberville Projects
  - St. Bernard Projects
  - Fischer Projects
  - Lafitte Projects
  - DeGaulle Manor

Hammond, Louisiana

Terrace Of Hammond (212 Neighborhood)

Cypress Cove (Grace Quaters Neighborhood)

Simpson Place (Grace Quaters Neighborhood)

Rufus Bankston (Gatesville/Edgewood Neighborhood)

Contempo Apartments (Gatesville/Edgewood Neighborhood)

Tangi Village (Gatesville/Edgewood Neighborhood)

Jordan Place Apartments (Gatesville/Edgewood Neighborhood)

Hammond Place (Mooney Neighborhood)

The Burrow (Mooney Neighborhood)

== Maryland ==
- Annapolis
  - Newtowne 20
  - Robinwood
  - Harbour House
  - Eastport Terrace
  - Bywater Mutual Homes
  - Annapolis Gardens
  - Obery Court
- Baltimore
  - Flaghouse Homes
  - O'Donnell Heights
  - Perkins Homes
  - Murphy Homes (demolished)
  - Poe Homes
  - Cherry Hill Homes
  - Lexington Terrace (demolished)
  - Gilmore Homes
  - Latrobe Homes
  - Westport Homes
  - Douglass Homes
  - Somerset Homes
  - McCulloh Homes
  - Brooklyn Homes

== Massachusetts ==
- Boston (Boston Housing Authority)
  - Mary Ellen McCormack (South Boston)
  - Old Colony (South Boston)
  - Basilica (Charlestown)
  - Bunker Hill (Charlestown)
  - Newtown (Charlestown)
  - Mishawum (Charlestown)
  - Commonwealth (Brighton)
  - Fanueil (Brighton)
  - Franklin Field Apartments (Dorchester)
  - Franklin Hill (Dorchester)
  - Heritage Apartments (East Boston)
  - Orient Heights (East Boston)
  - Maverick (East Boston)
  - Fairmount (Hyde Park)
  - Mildred C. Hailey Apartments (Jamaica Plain)
  - South Street (Jamaica Plain)
  - Gallivan Boulevard Homes (Mattapan/Dorchester Line)
  - Archdale (Roslindale)
  - Washington-Beechland (Roslindale)
  - Alice Heyward Taylor Apartments (Mission Hill)
  - Highland Park (Roxbury)
  - Whittier Street Apartments (Roxbury)
  - Madison Park (Mission Hill)
  - Mission Main (Mission Hill)
  - Camden (South End)
  - Lenox Street Apartments (South End)
  - Cathedral (South End)
  - Rutland/East Springfield Street (South End)
  - West Newton Street (South End)
- Cambridge
  - Washington Elms (The Port)
  - Lincoln Way (North Cambridge)
  - Putnam Gardens (Riverside)
  - Rindge Towers (North Cambridge)
  - Woodrow Wilson Apartments (Cambridgeport)
  - Jefferson Park (North Cambridge)
- Holyoke (Holyoke Housing Authority)
  - Beaudoin Village (Homestead Avenue)
  - Lyman Terrace (Downtown)
  - Toepfert Apartments (The Flats)
  - Churchill Home (Churchill)
  - Zielinski Apartments (Downtown)
  - Coughlin Apartments (Churchill)
  - Beaudry-Boucher Apartments (South Holyoke)
  - Falcetti Apartments (Churchill)
  - Rosary Towers (The Flats)
  - Murphy Congregate House (Whiting Farms)
  - Seibel Apartments (Highlands)
- Somerville
  - Claredon Hill Housing Projects
  - Mystic Avenue Housing Projects

== Michigan ==
- Detroit
  - Brewster-Douglass
  - Herman Gardens
  - Jeffries Homes

== Minnesota ==
- Minneapolis
  - Elliot Towers
  - Hiawatha Towers
  - Charles Horn Towers
  - Little Earth
  - Riverside Plaza
  - Sumner Field Homes (demolished 1998)
- Saint Paul
  - Central Homes
  - Dunedin Homes
  - Edgerton Hi-Rise
  - Mt. Airy Homes
  - Valley Tower

== Missouri ==
- St. Louis
  - Pruitt–Igoe (demolished)
  - Cochran Gardens (demolished)
  - Peabody Homes

== Nebraska ==
- Omaha
  - Omaha Housing Authority
  - Logan Fontenelle Housing Project
  - Ernie Chambers Court
  - Farnam Building

== Nevada ==
- Las Vegas
  - Sherman Gardens
  - Gerson Park (demolished)
  - Hullum Homes
  - Ernie Gragin Terrace (demolished)

== New Jersey ==
- Asbury Park
  - Lincoln Village
  - Boston Way Village
  - Asbury Park Village
- Atlantic City
  - Walter J. Buzby Homes
  - Stanley Holmes Village
- Bridgeton
  - Maplewood Gardens
- Camden
  - Westfield Acres (demolished)
  - Crestbury Apartments
  - McGuire Gardens (demolished)
  - Roosevelt Manor (demolished)
  - Ablett Village
  - Chelton Terrace (demolished)
- East Orange
  - Arcadian Gardens (demolished)
- Elizabeth
  - Mravlag Manor (Bayway)
  - Pioneer Homes (demolished)
  - Oakwood Plaza
  - Migliore Manor (demolished)
- Guttenberg
  - Centennial Towers
  - Golden Gardens
- Hackensack
  - Oratam Court
- Harrison
  - Harrison Gardens
- Hoboken
  - Adams Gardens
  - Andrew Jackson Gardens
  - Christopher Columbus Gardens
  - Fox Hill Gardens
  - Harrison Gardens
  - Monroe Gardens
- Irvington
  - Camptown Gardens
- Jersey City
  - A. Harry Moore Homes (Duncan) (demolished)
  - Marion Gardens
  - Hudson Gardens
  - Curries Woods (partially demolished)
  - Lafayette Gardens (demolished)
  - Booker T. Washington Gardens
  - Arlington Gardens
  - Montgomery Gardens (partially demolished)
  - Holland Gardens
  - Salem Lafayette Apartments
  - Berry Gardens
- Morristown
  - Manahan Village
- Mount Holly
  - Mt. Holly Gardens
- New Brunswick
  - Memorial Homes (demolished)
  - Schwartz Homes
  - Robeson Village
- Newark
  - Brick Towers (demolished)
  - Baxter Terrace (demolished)
  - Prudential Apartments (Sing-Sing)
  - Stella Wright Homes (demolished)
  - Scudder Homes (partially demolished)
  - Christopher Columbus Homes (demolished)
  - Hayes Homes (demolished)
  - Seth Boyden Terrace (vacant)
  - Otto Kretchmer Homes (Dayton Street) (partially demolished)
  - Genesis Towers (vacant)
  - Hill Manor (demolished)
  - Oriental Village
  - Garden Spires
  - John W. Hyatt Court (partially demolished)
  - Archbishop Walsh Homes (demolished)
  - Bradley Court
  - Pennington Court
  - Pueblo City
  - Douglass-Harrison Homes (demolished)
  - Felix Fuld Court (Little Bricks) (vacant)
  - Stephen Crane Village
  - Millard Terrell Homes (Riverview Court)
- Orange
  - Father Rasi Homes (demolished)
  - Walter G. Alexander Homes (demolished)
- Passaic
  - Alfred Speer Village
  - Vreeland Village
- Paterson
  - Riverside Terrace
  - Alexander Hamilton Homes (Alabama) (demolished)
  - Riverview Towers
  - Dean McNulty Homes (demolished)
  - Christopher Columbus Homes (demolished)
- Perth Amboy
  - John A. Delaney Homes (demolished)
- Plainfield
  - Elmwood Gardens (demolished)
  - Liberty Village
- Trenton
  - Donnelly Homes
  - Miller Homes (demolished)
  - Woodrow Wilson Homes
  - Oakland Park Apartments
- Union City
  - Hillside Terrace
  - Columbian Court
- West New York
  - Sunshine Gardens
  - Kennedy Towers

== New York ==
- Buffalo
  - Glenny Drive Apartments also known as Kensington Heights (demolished)
  - Ellicott Mall (partially demolished and converted into privately owned Ellicott Town Center)
  - Marine Drive Apartments (formerly Dante Place)
  - Frederick Douglass Towers (formerly Talbert Mall)
  - Ferry Grider Apartments
  - Commodore Perry Homes
  - A.D. Price Courts
  - Jasper Parrish Homes
  - LaSalle Courts
  - Kenfield Homes
  - Kensington Gardens
  - Kowal
  - Langfield Home
  - Redwood Village
  - Shaffer Village
  - Willert Park Homes
  - Woodson Gardens (demolished)
- New York City (See New York City Housing Authority)
  - Bronx
    - Bronx River Houses
    - Butler Houses
    - Edenwald Houses
    - Forest Houses
    - James Monroe Houses
    - McKinley Houses
    - Mill Brook Houses
    - Morris Houses
    - Morrisania Air Rights
    - Patterson Houses
    - Pelham Parkway Houses
    - Saint Mary's Park Houses
    - Sedgwick Houses
    - Sotomayor Houses
    - Twin Parks
    - Webster Houses
  - Brooklyn
    - Atlantic Terminal Site 4B
    - Bay View Houses
    - Bay View Houses
    - Borinquen Plaza
    - Breukelen Houses
    - Brevoort Houses
    - Bushwick-Hylan Houses
    - Coney Island Houses
    - Cooper Park Houses
    - Cypress Hills Houses
    - Farragut Houses
    - Fort Greene Houses
    - Glenwood Houses
    - Gowanus Houses
    - Hope Gardens
    - Independence Towers
    - Ingersoll Houses
    - Jonathan Williams Plaza
    - Kingsborough Houses-Kingsborough Extension
    - Lafayette Gardens
    - Louis Heaton Pink Houses
    - Marcus Garvey Houses
    - Marcy Houses
    - Marlboro Houses
    - Prospect Plaza Houses (demolished)
    - Red Hook Houses
    - Seth Low Houses
    - Sheepshead Bay Houses
    - Sumner Houses
    - Taylor–Wythe Houses
    - Walt Whitman Houses
    - Williamsburg Houses
    - Wyckoff Gardens
  - Manhattan
    - Alfred E. Smith Houses
    - Amsterdam Houses
    - Baruch Houses
    - Bethune Gardens
    - Bracetti Plaza
    - Carver Houses
    - Chelsea-Elliott Houses
    - Clinton Houses
    - Drew-Hamilton Houses
    - Dyckman Houses
    - East River Houses
    - Elliott-Chelsea Houses
    - First Houses
    - Fort Washington Ave Rehab
    - Frederick Douglass Houses
    - Fulton Houses
    - Gaylord White Houses
    - Gompers Houses
    - Grant Houses
    - Harborview Terrace
    - Harlem River Houses
    - Hernandez Houses
    - Holmes Towers
    - Isaacs Houses
    - Jefferson Houses
    - Knickerbocker Village
    - LaGuardia Houses
    - Lexington Houses
    - Lillian Wald Houses
    - Lower East Side I Infill
    - Manhattan Plaza
    - Manhattanville Houses
    - Marble Hill Houses
    - Meltzer Tower
    - Metro North Plaza
    - Rangel Houses
    - Riis Houses
    - Robbins Plaza
    - Robert F. Wagner Houses
    - Rutgers Houses
    - St. Nicholas Houses
    - Seward Park Extension
    - Straus Houses
    - Taft Houses
    - Vladeck Houses
  - Queens
    - Astoria Houses
    - Baisley Park Houses
    - Bland Houses
    - Forest Hills Co-op Houses
    - Hammel Houses
    - Latimer Gardens
    - Ocean Bay Apartments (Bayside)
    - Queensbridge Houses
    - Redfern Houses
    - South Jamaica Houses
  - Staten Island
    - Berry Houses
    - Mariners Harbor Houses
    - Stapleton Houses
- Syracuse
  - Almus Olver Towers
  - Benderson Heights
  - Fahey Court
  - James Geddes Rowhouses
  - McKinney Manor
  - Pioneer Homes
  - Ross Towers
  - Toomey Abbott Towers
  - Vinette Towers

== Ohio ==
- Cincinnati
  - Beacon Glen
  - (The) Beechwood
  - Clinton Springs
  - (The) Evanston
  - Fernside Place
  - Findlater Gardens
  - Horizon Hills
  - Liberty Apartments
  - Maple Tower
  - Marianna Terrace
  - Marquette Manor
  - Millvale
  - Park Eden
  - Pinecrest
  - President
  - (The) Redding
  - (The) Riverview
  - San Marco
  - Setty Kuhn
  - Stanley Rowe Towers
  - Sutter View
  - Winton Terrace
- Cleveland (Cuyahoga Metropolitan Housing Authority)
  - Bellaire Garden (A&B)
  - Carver Park
  - Crestview Apartments
  - Lakeview Terrace
  - Miles Elmarge
  - Oakwood Villas
  - Olde Cedar
  - Outhwaite Homes
  - Springbrook
  - Wade Apartments
  - Willson Tower
- Columbus
  - Avondale
  - Chestnut Grove
  - Eastmoor Square
  - Elim Manor
  - Four Pointe
  - Glenview Estates
  - Indian Meadows
  - Jenkins Terrace
  - Legacy Pointe at Poindexter
  - Maplewood Heights
  - The Meadows
  - New Village Place
  - Ohio Townhouses
  - Poindexter Place
  - Poindexter Village (demolished)
  - Post Oak Station
  - Rosewind
  - Sawyer Manor
  - Sugar Grove Square Apartments
  - Thornwood Commons
  - Trevitt Heights
  - The Whitney
  - Worley Terrace
- Dayton
  - Desoto Bass Court
  - Arlington Court (demolished)
  - Dunbar Manor (demolished)
  - Parkside Holmes (demolished)
  - Washington Arms
  - Caliph Court
  - Mt. Crest Court
  - Hilltop Homes
  - Edgewood Court (demolished)

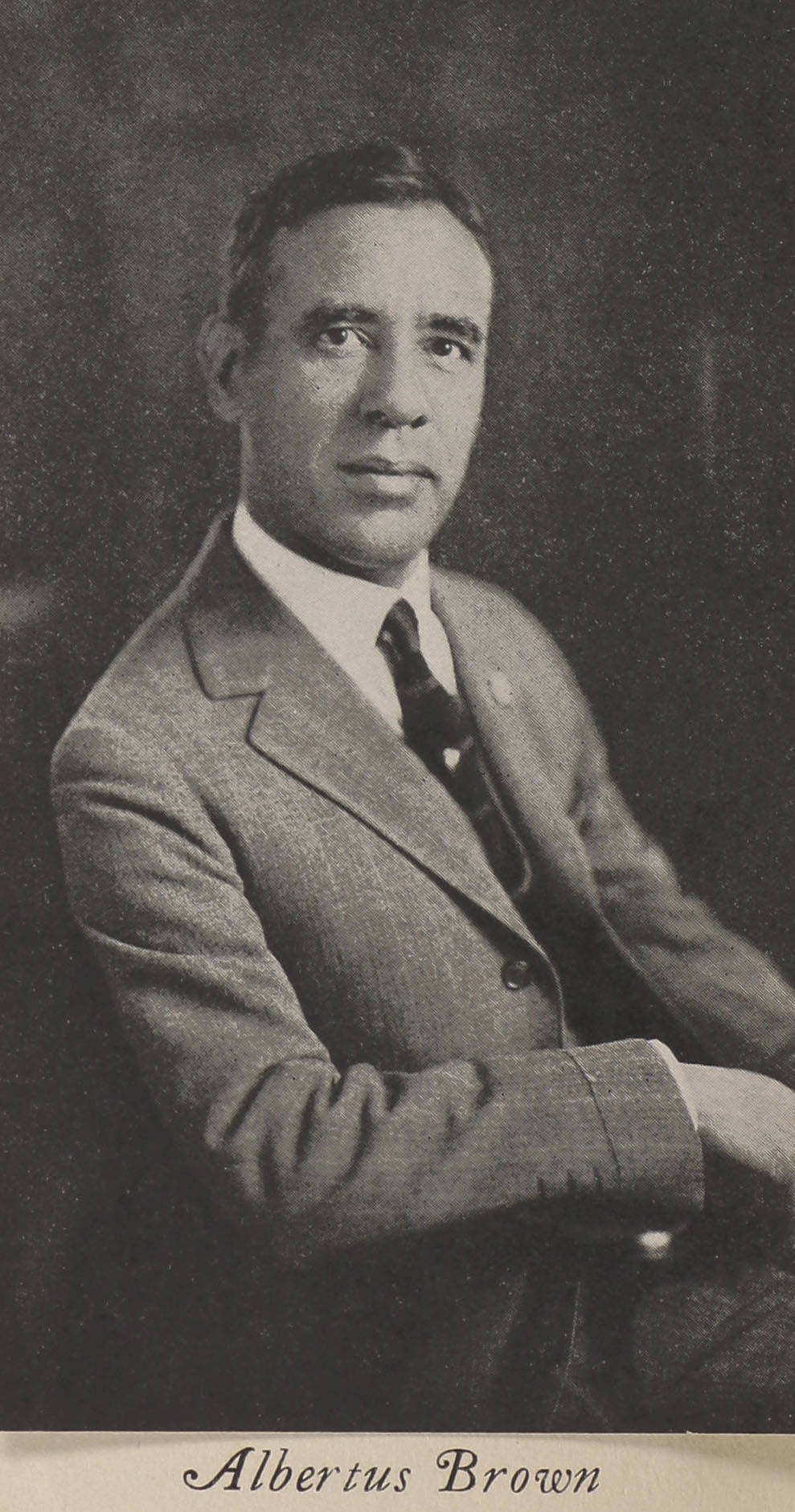
Albertus Brown Homes, named after Toledo lawyer Albertus Brown

- Toledo
  - Albertus Brown Homes
  - Brand Whitlock Homes
  - Charles F. Weiler Homes
  - Cherrywood Apts.
  - John Holland Estates
  - Moody Manor
  - McClinton-Nunn Homes
  - New Town Apts.
  - Port Lawrence Homes
  - Vistula Manor

== Oklahoma ==
- Oklahoma City
  - Ambassador Courts
  - Fred Factory Gardens
  - Northeast Duplexes
  - Oak Grove
  - Will Rogers Courts
- Tulsa
  - Apache Manor
  - Vernon Manor
  - Parkview Terrace
  - Comanche Park
  - The Meadows
  - Mohawk Manor
  - East Central Village
  - Pioneer Plaza
  - Hewgley Terrace
  - Riverview Park
  - Sandy Park
  - South Haven Manor
  - LaFortune Tower
  - Seminole Hills/Whitlow
  - Inhofe Plaza
  - Murdock Villa
  - Towne Square

== Oregon ==
- Portland
  - New Columbia

== Pennsylvania ==
- Bethlehem
  - Pembroke Village, East Side
- Philadelphia
  - See Public housing in Philadelphia
- Pittsburgh
  - Allegheny Dwellings
  - Arlington Heights
  - Bedford Dwellings
  - Caliguiri Plaza
  - Carrick Regency
  - Finello Pavilion
  - Gualtieri Manor
  - Homewood North
  - Manchester Commons
  - Mazza Pavilion
  - Morse Gardens
  - Murray Towers
  - Northview Heights
  - Pennsylvania Bidwell
  - Pressley Street
  - St. Clair Village

== Puerto Rico ==
- El coto (Arecibo, PR)
- La meseta (Arecibo, PR)
- La Trina (Arecibo, PR)

== South Carolina ==
Charleston

- Robert Mills Manor
- William Enston Home

Columbia

- Gonzales Gardens

== Tennessee ==
- Memphis
  - Dixie Homes
  - LeMoyne Gardens

== Texas ==
- Austin
  - Santa Rita Courts
  - Rosewood Courts
  - Chalmers Courts
  - Meadowbrook
  - Booker T. Washington
- Dallas
  - Turner Court
- Fort Worth, Texas
  - Butler Place
  - Caville
- Galveston
  - Cedar Terrace (demolished)
  - Magnolia Homes (demolished)
  - Oleander Homes (demolished)
  - Holland House

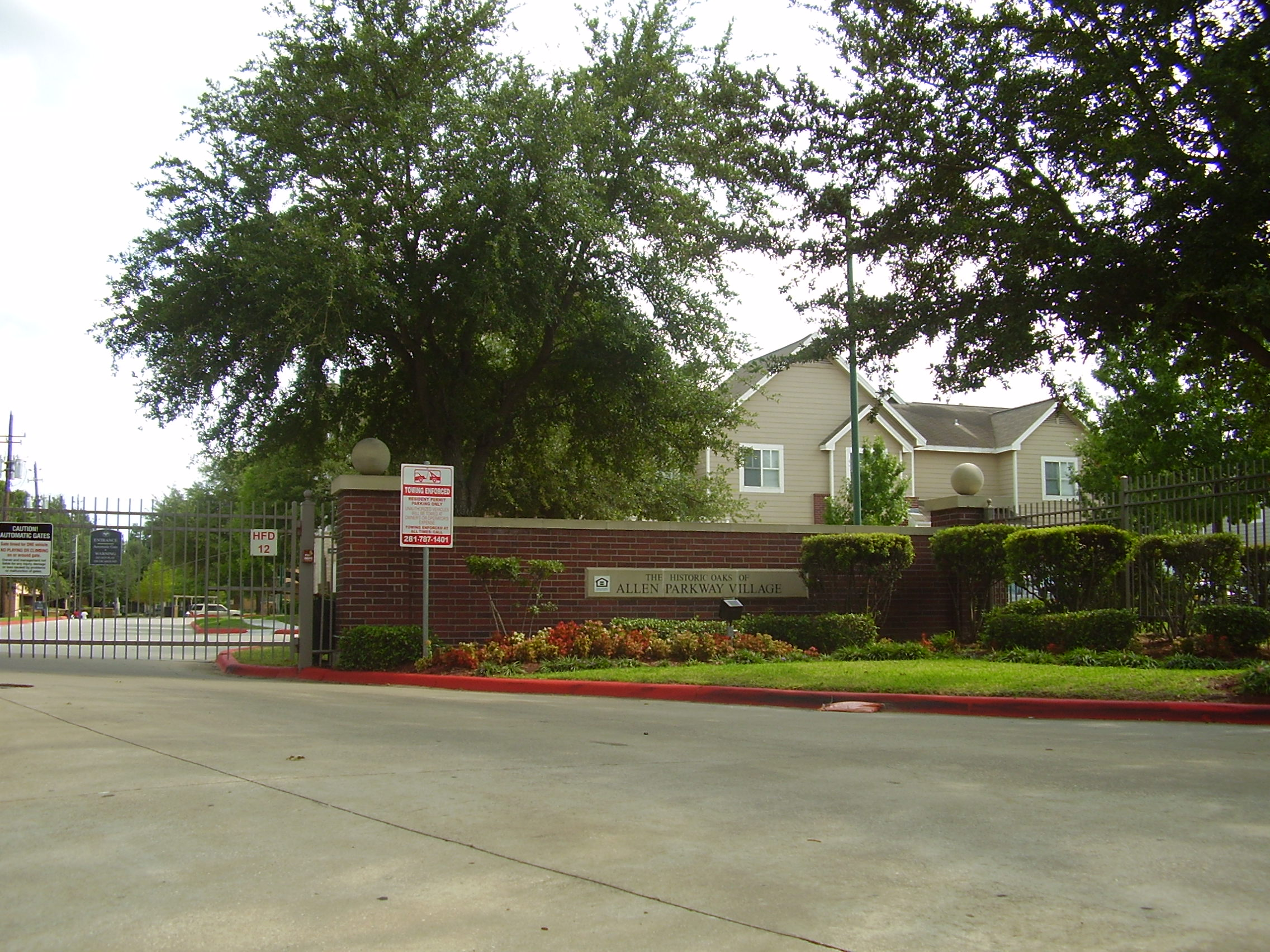
Historic Oaks of Allen Parkway Village

- Houston
  - Clayton Homes
  - Cuney Homes
  - Ewing Apartments
  - Forest Green Townhomes
  - Garden City Apartments
  - Historic Oaks of Allen Parkway Village
  - Irvington Place
  - Kelly Court
  - Lincoln Park
  - Long Drive Townhomes
  - Wilmington House
  - Kennedy Place
  - Oxford Place
  - Victory Apartments
  - Heatherbrook
- San Antonio
  - Alazán-Apache Courts
  - Cassiano Homes
  - Lincoln Heights Courts
  - Villa Veramendi Homes
  - Wheatley Courts (demolition 2014)
  - Victoria Courts (demolition 2000)
  - San Juan Homes (demolition 2013)
  - Menchaca Homes (demolished)
  - Mirasol Homes (demolished)
  - East Terrace Homes (demolished)
  - Sutton Homes (demolished)

== Washington ==
- Seattle
  - Yesler Terrace
  - Holly Park
  - High Point
  - Westwood

== Washington, D.C. ==
- Arthur Capper/Carrollsburg
- Carroll Apartments
- Barry Farm
- Benning Terrace
- Claridge Towers
- Colorado Apartments
- Columbia Road
- Edgewood
- Elvans Road
- Fort Dupont Dwellings
- Fort Lincoln
- Garfield Terrace
- Glencrest
- Greenleaf
- Harvard Towers
- Henson Ridge
- Highland Dwellings
- Hopkin Apartments
- Kelly Miller
- Kenilworth Courts
- Knox Hill
- Langston Terrace Dwellings
- Ledroit Apartments
- Lincoln Heights
- Lincoln Road
- Marigold
- Marley Ridge
- Montana Terrace
- Oak Street Apartments
- Ontario Road/McDermott
- Park Morton Apartments
- Potomac Gardens
- Richardson Dwellings
- Sibley Plaza
- Stoddert Terrace
- Sursum Corda Cooperative
- Syphax Gardens
- Townhomes on Capitol Hill
- Triangle View
- The Villager
- Wade Apartments
- Wheeler Creek
- Woodland Terrace

== Wisconsin ==
- Milwaukee (Housing Authority of the City of Milwaukee)
  - Arlington Court
  - Becher Court
  - Berryland
  - Cherry Court
  - College Court
  - Convent Hill
  - Highland Gardens
  - Highland Homes
  - Hillside Terrace
  - Hillside Terrace Highrise
  - Holton Terrace
  - Lapham Park
  - Townhomes at Carver Park
  - Lincoln Court
  - Locust Court
  - Merrill Park
  - Mitchell Court
  - Northlawn
  - Olga Village
  - Parklawn
  - Riverview
  - Southlawn
  - Southlawn Park
  - Westlawn
