= Ra Diggs =

American rapper and convicted murderer (born 1982)

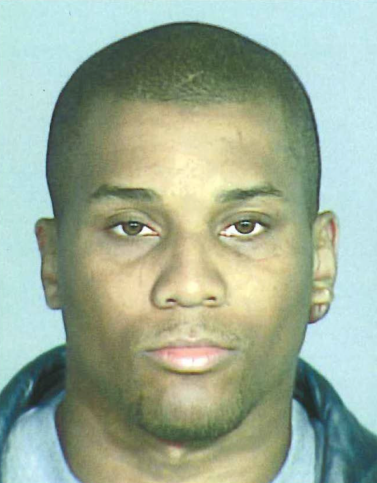
- Ra Diggs in 2010

Background information
- Also known as: Ra Diggs
- Born: Ronald Herron; March 30, 1982 (age 44); Brooklyn, New York, U.S.
- Genre: Gangsta rap
- Occupations: Rapper; gangster
- Years active: 2007–2010
- Label: VangodENT
- Formerly of: Murda Team
- Criminal information
- Status: Incarcerated
- Convictions: First-degree murder (×3); Attempted murder (×3); Conspiracy to murder (×4); Distribution of narcotics (×2); Racketeering conspiracy (×1); Engaging in a continuing criminal enterprise (×1)
- Penalty: 12 life sentences

Details
- Date apprehended: October 5, 2010
- Imprisoned at: ADX Florence, Colorado, U.S.

Ronald Herron (born March 30, 1982), known as Ra Diggs, is an American former rapper and convicted murderer who is serving a life sentence at the ADX Florence prison in Colorado.

== Early life ==
Herron was born in 1982 in Brooklyn, he was raised in the Gowanus Houses by his mother. At the age of 12, he witnessed the shooting death of his childhood friend by a local police officer.

== Music career ==
Following his release from prison in July 2007, Herron began pursuing music. He collaborated with other artists including Uncle Murda and Waka Flocka Flame, forming a group known as the “Murda Team.” The group released songs including “We Run NY” and “Slow Down Remix.”

In March 2010, he started posting music videos to a YouTube channel called "VANGODENT". On June 11, 2010, he released a song to the channel called "Eulogy". It has over 1,100,000 views as of March 2025.

=== Jim Jones feud ===
In 2010, Herron was involved in an altercation with rapper Jim Jones at a music studio where he was recording. Witnesses claim that Herron later followed Jones to a nightclub with a hit squad and attempted to kill him, causing Jones and his entourage to flee.

== Herron's crimes ==
=== Early arrests ===
At the age of 14, Herron was arrested for armed robbery. He served his sentence in Rikers Island, he was released after four years.

In 2001, Herron was charged with first-degree murder and drug trafficking. Herron was acquitted of the murder charge and pled guilty to drug trafficking. He was sentenced to six years imprisonment which he served in Southport Prison.

Herron was the leader of a Bloods gang set known as the “Murderous Mad Dogs.” His organization controlled the Boerum Hill area, in particular the Gowanus and Wyckoff housing apartments. The gang engaged in extortion, drug trafficking, contract killing and armed robbery.

=== Murder victims ===
On June 16, 2001, Herron shot and killed local drug dealer Frederick Brooks. He was arrested and charged in state court, but was acquitted in 2002. It was later alleged that Herron and his associates threatened the witnesses in the case.

On May 9, 2008, a man named Richard Russo was murdered in an elevator in the Wyckoff Gardens housing complex. Witnesses described an altercation ensuing before a weapon was produced and Russo was shot dead. Herron was later charged and convicted of his murder.

In 2009, Herron chased down and murdered rival drug dealer Victor Zapata. Herron followed him through the courtyard of the Wyckoff Gardens apartment buildings and killed him.

== Arrest and indictment ==
On October 5, 2010, Herron was arrested outside a nightclub and charged with drug offenses. Following a search of his vehicle, police found a loaded firearm and body armor. He was later federally indicted on 21 counts including three murders, drug distribution, and violating the RICO Act. Herron was convicted on June 26, 2014 on all counts. At trial, several of Ra Diggs songs and music videos were used as evidence because they were "literal recountings of his crimes".

In his own defense prior to his sentencing, Herron addressed the courtroom and stated:

“You guys sit here and continue to paint this picture that I’m the devil incarnate, the scourge of righteousness — it’s all crap … Even the most dim prosecutor could have secured a conviction under this atmosphere of guilt they built. They did all but point a big, red arrow of 'guilty' up on that projection screen. You denigrate me like I’m some sort of societal pestilence. What have you contributed to my community?”

Herron later told the judge that he could give him 10 life terms and that he was only going to die once. On April 2, 2015, he was sentenced to 12 life sentences plus 105 years in prison. He is currently housed at ADX Florence in Colorado.

== Life imprisonment ==
In early 2015, during a routine search of his jail cell at the MCC New York complex, officers found a collection of razor blades and a mobile phone under Herron’s mattress.

Following his sentencing, Herron was transported to the ADX Florence supermax facility in Colorado. Inmates at the ADX complex are held in isolation for 23 hours per day with minimal human contact. In December 2022, he was transferred to the neighbouring prison USP Florence High. From March 2025, Herron was back in ADX Florence until 2026 when he was transferred back to USP Florence High.

On April 8, 2015, Herron sent an appeal to the United States Court of Appeals for the Second Circuit claiming that his conviction violated his constitutional First Amendment rights. The conviction was upheld on February 14, 2019, with the court saying that his First Amendment challenge was "without merit".
