= Washington Village =

Washington Village may refer to:

- Washington Village, an area of Washington in the county of Tyne and Wear in northeast England
- Washington Village, Baltimore, Maryland, also known as Pigtown, Baltimore, an area of the city of Baltimore, Maryland
- Washington Village (Norwalk, Connecticut), public housing complex in Norwalk, Connecticut
