= Kensington Heights, Buffalo =

Coordinates: 42.942°N 78.808°W

Kensington Heights is a neighborhood located in the central part of Buffalo. The neighborhood is home to institutions including Burgard Vocational High School, Dr. Lydia T. Wright School of Excellence, and the Health Care Center for Children at ECMC.

In 1980, the Kensington Heights housing project was 92% minority with a vacancy rate of 65%.
