= Arthur Capper/Carrollsburg =

Former public housing project in Washington, D.C., United States

Coordinates: 38.8779°N 77.0006°W

- Aerial view, 1980s

General information
- Location: Washington, D.C., US
- Status: Demolished
- Area: 23 acres (9.3 ha)
- No. of units: 707 households
- Density: 50 units per acre (120/ha)

Construction
- Constructed: 1958
- Architect: Hilyard Robinson

Listing
- Demolished: 2000

Arthur Capper/Carrollsburg was a public housing project located in the Capitol Hill neighborhood of Southeast Washington, D.C. Popularly known to its residents as "Capers", the housing project was bound by Virginia Avenue, M Street, 2nd Street, and 5th Street, SE.

First built in 1958 under the direction of architect Hilyard Robinson, it was named after Kansas Senator Arthur Capper, who, as District of Columbia Committee, helped create the first housing authority in Washington, D.C.

The project consisted of the Arthur Capper Senior, Arthur Capper Family, and Carrollsburg Family developments. The project altogether housed 707 households. Beginning in 2000, the buildings became subject to demolition as part of the city's redevelopment efforts.

== Social and cultural life ==
The Arthur Capper/Carrollsburg project was well known for its sports teams, including the semi-pro football team Washington Stonewalls which was founded in 1946 by Ben Wright. By 1995, the team was recognized as the oldest "continuously operating" semi-pro football team in the United States. The team's first coach was Richard Perry and notable former players include former Major League Baseball player Maury Wills and Luke C. Moore, a DC Superior Court judge for whom a D.C. Public School is named.

The Arthur Capper Recreation Center was the team's practice field and where the team sometimes hosted teams from other predominately black neighborhoods in Washington, DC as well as teams from different states.

The Arthur Capper/Carrollsburg community was also known for musical groups and the Arthur Capper Recreation Center. In 1970, the Martin Luther King Jr. Food Cooperative was opened and operated by and for the residents. One of the prominent leaders was Beatrice Gray.

While it was officially named after Senator Arthur Capper, its nickname, "Capers," likely referred to Helen T. Capers. Helen T. Capers was the playground coordinator for decades at the Lincoln Playground located at 6th and L Streets, SE.

== Closure and redevelopment ==
Three of the four Arthur Capper buildings between 5th and 7th streets were demolished in 2000. In 2001, D.C. received a $34.9 million Hope VI grant to redevelop the 23-acre Capper/Carrollsburg public housing project as a mixed-income community. The New York Times noted that officials promised that the "redevelopment of the Arthur Capper and Carrollsburg projects" was "the first in the country to promise replacement of all low-income units within the same neighborhood".

The new buildings at the site are now called Capitol Quarter. In 2007, the new Arthur Capper Seniors Building opened with 162 units. The Capper residents have been waiting for ten years for the rebuilding of the Arthur Capper Recreation Center, which is now being called the Community Center.

== Legacy ==
According to Faye Harrison, the 2007 American Anthropological Association Program Chair, "In response to Hope VI’s plan to demolish Capers’ 707 units, Friends and Residents of Arthur Capper and Carrollsburg was founded in 1999. The neighborhood watchdog organization aims to protect the rights of residents in the relocation process."

Anu Yadav wrote a play called "Capers" based on her work with this group and her research in the community. The D.C. Humanities Council funded this work. Parts of the play appeared in the film "Chocolate City."

Today, the Arthur Capper community has a Facebook page and a website with an oral history project.

== See also ==
- HOPE VI
- List of public housing developments in the United States
- Public housing in the United States
