= Bracetti Plaza =

Public housing development in Manhattan, New York

- NYCHA property
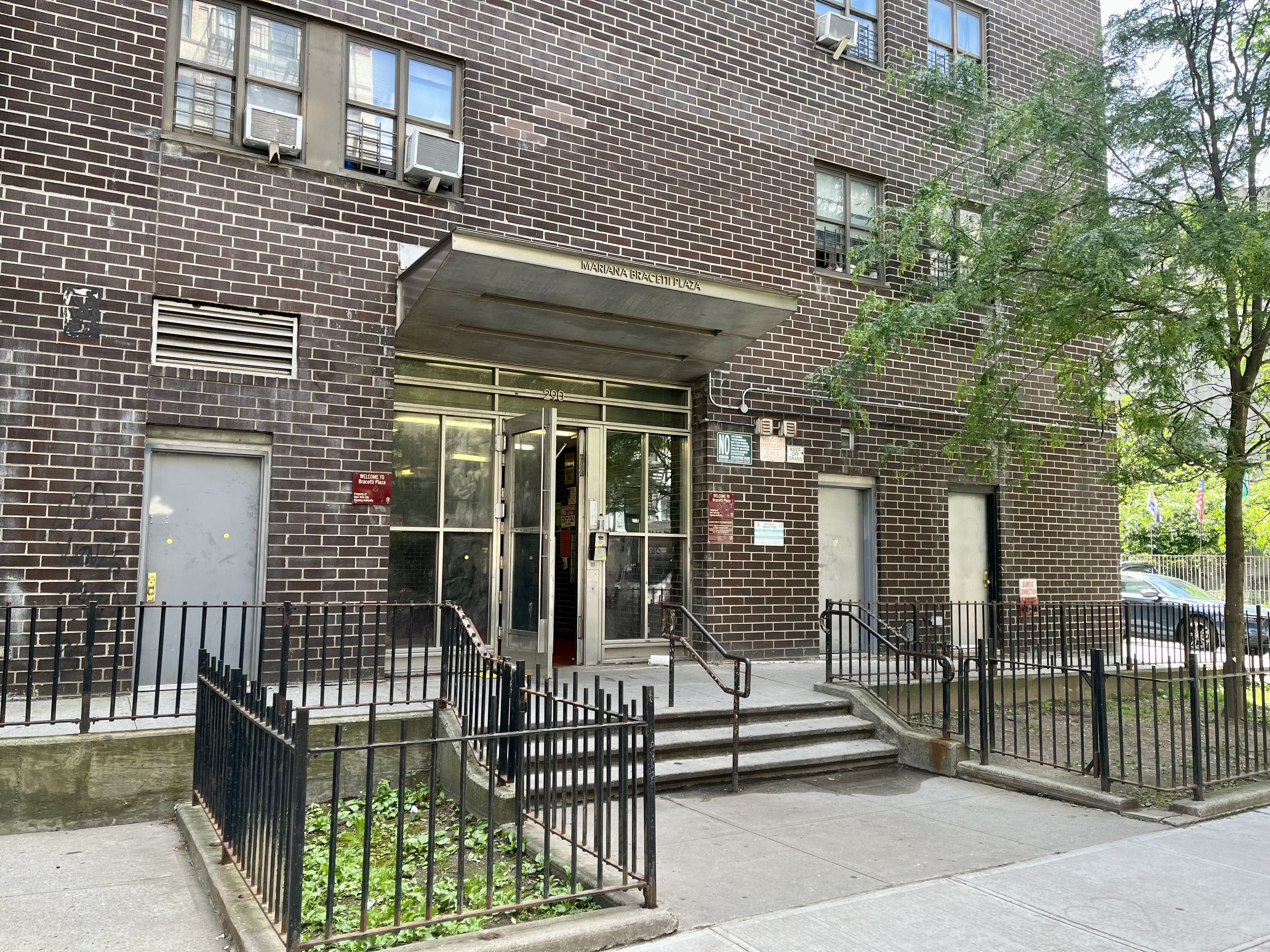
- Bracetti Plaza in 2024
- Interactive map of Bracetti Plaza
- Coordinates: 40.722191°N 73.981028°W
- Country: United States
- State: New York
- City: New York City
- Borough: Manhattan

Area
  - Total: 0.001 sq mi (0.0026 km^{2})

Population
  - Total: 265
  - Density: 270,000/sq mi (100,000/km^{2})
- ZIP codes: 10009
- Area codes: 212, 332, 646, and 917
- Website: my.nycha.info/DevPortal/

Bracetti Plaza, or Mariana Bracetti Plaza, is a public housing development built and maintained by the New York City Housing Authority in Alphabet City, a section of the East Village neighborhood on Manhattan's Lower East Side. The development is named after Mariana Bracetti (1825–1903), a legendary Puerto Rican woman who was known as the "Arms of Gold", and who was the first to craft the Boriquas Latin Cross, Puerto Rico's first flag. The flag was designed by Dr. Ramon Emeterio Betances, and is still a symbol of the Puerto Rican independence movement.

Bracetti Plaza is a seven-story building on grounds measuring 1.02 acres (4,100 m^{2}), at 251 East 3rd Street, or 290 East 4th Street. The development has 108 apartments housing approximately 312 people. The block it sits in is bordered by Avenue B to the west, Avenue C to the east, East 3rd Street to the south, and East 4th Street to the north.

Bracetti Plaza was completed on May 31, 1974. It is serviced by the New York City Police Department's Ninth Precinct, and is governed by Manhattan Community Board 3. As of 2010, no one is serving as the Resident Association President for Bracetti Plaza. If someone were, he or she would be a member of the Manhattan South District Citywide Council of Presidents.

== See also ==
- List of New York City Housing Authority properties
