= Saint Mary's Park Houses =

Public housing development in the Bronx, New York

St. Mary's Park Houses
- NYCHA Property
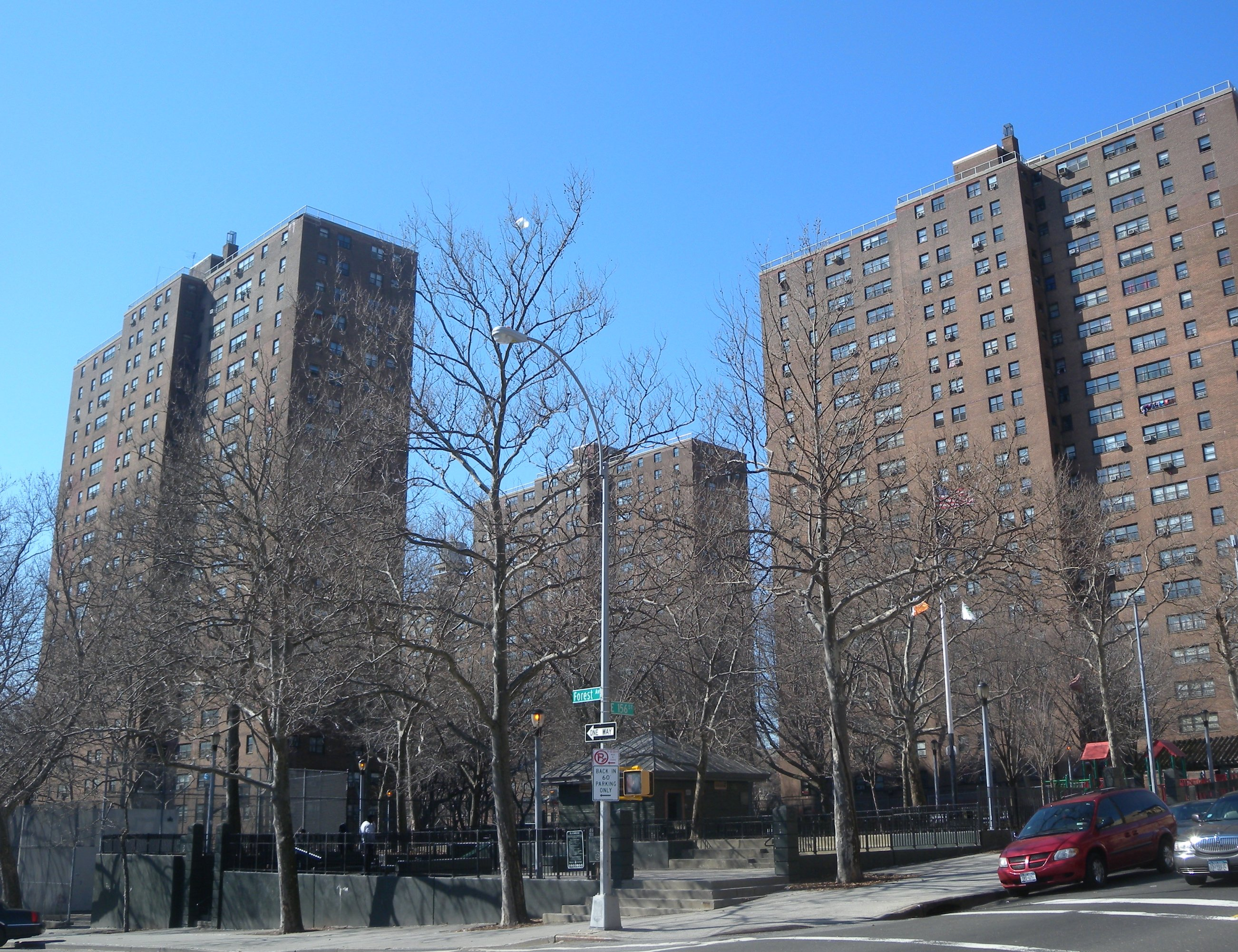
- Interactive map of St. Mary's Park Houses
- Country: United States
- State: New York
- City: New York City
- Borough: Bronx

Area
  - Total: 12.67 acres (5.13 ha)

Population
  - Total: 1,881
- Zip Code: 10455

The St. Mary's Park Houses is a NYCHA housing project with six buildings that consists of 21 and 22 stories. It is located between East 149th Street/Westchester Avenue to East 156th Street and also between Cauldwell to Trinity/Forest Avenues in Melrose, the Bronx. It is located near the Jackson Avenue station on the IRT White Plains Road Line and St. Mary's Park.

== History ==
The project was approved by the Board of Estimate on February 4, 1953. The groundbreaking ceremony was held on May 9, 1956; construction of this housing project was completed in April 1959. The housing complex was designed by the architectural firm of Voorhees, Walker, Smith & Smith.

=== 21st century ===
In the roundup in Summer of 2025, this housing project had roofing repairs along with Washington Houses for structural repairs, railings, beams, and insulation.

== See also ==
- New York City Housing Authority
