= Taft Homes =

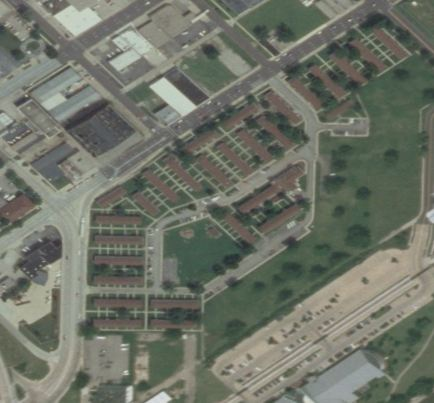
- Aerial overview of the Taft Homes
- Interactive map of Taft Homes

General information
- Location: Peoria, Illinois
- Coordinates: 40°41′43.27″N 89°34′58.76″W
- Status: Completed

Construction
- Constructed: 1952

Listing
- Demolished: Partially in 1996

Other information
- Governing body: Peoria Housing Authority

The Taft Homes are a public housing project located off the Illinois River in Peoria, Illinois. In total there are 200 apartments in Taft, housed in separate wood-framed buildings. The Taft Homes are currently in the early stages of a redevelopment project that calls for the demolition of all current units, with the lots then transformed into mixed-income housing.

== History ==
The Taft Homes, named after Ohio senator Robert A Taft, were originally built in 1952 as a temporary means of shelter for veterans returning from the Korean War. The buildings soon transitioned to low income housing and during the 1960s and 70s the housing project saw multiple violent riots. In 1968 ten police officers and a reporter were wounded after a minor incident turned into a race riot that lasted for around 3 hours. A second major race riot occurred in 1970 after the police evicted two female residents from the Taft Homes; resulting in rioting that spread throughout other public housing projects in the city. In 1996 all 220 units in the complex underwent comprehensive rehabilitation efforts by the city; the units received new siding, flooring and plumbing in order to make the buildings more energy efficient. The renovation efforts also added, and updated parking, lighting, sidewalks as well as various landscaping work. During its modernization effort the Housing Authority decided to demolish the 15 buildings closest to the river, that were known for illicit activities. The United States Marine Corps, U.S. Navy Seabees and Illinois Air National Guard helped in the demolition effort.

=== Redevelopment plan ===
Following the rehabilitation project of 1996 Peoria Public Housing decided to pursue a redevelopment of the units. The plan calls for a mixed income neighborhood, that could include some market rate homes, along the desirable Illinois River. The first development would begin along the shoreline, an area left vacant by the demolition of the 15 original buildings located at the site. Demolition of the current buildings would begin after the current residents find alternate housing options.

=== Conditions ===
In 2019, ProPublica and The Southern Illinoisan reported that Taft Homes failed three of its five recent inspections. Residents reported issues with mold, maggots, cockroaches, water damage, exposed gas pipes, uncovered outlets, and other code violations. Police patrols of the area increased due to a high crime rate.

=== Providence Pointe ===
On October 7 2021, groundbreaking began for the new Providence Pointe development. The first phase of demolition was completed in September 2022 and construction for the new units began. The new development plans for 142 affordable housing units, from one to five bedrooms. Units will be completed in rolling sets of 50. Instead of the barracks-style of Taft Homes, Providence Pointe will include townhouses and modern single-level houses. Rent is based on income and family size, capped at 30% of adjusted gross income. The estimated development cost is $43.7 million.

The first residents moved into the new Providence Pointe units in September 2023. Three Taft buildings remain; the Providence Pointe completion target date is March 2024.
