= Flag House Courts =

Former public housing project located in Baltimore, Maryland, United States

Coordinates: 39°17′18″N 76°36′6″W

Flag House Courts or Flaghouse Homes was a segregated public housing project built in 1955 in Baltimore, Maryland, comprising three 12-story buildings and multiple low-rise units. It had recreational facilities with bingo and dances, a swimming pool, and a basketball court. However, the complex had problems from its opening. Elevators often broke down, trapping riders for hours. Residents were forced to run fans, even in winter, because a faulty heating system made the buildings unbearably hot. There were also problems of crime and drug dealing. By the late 1960s, gunshots at the complex were common, and elevators and stairwells reeked of urine. Residents often threw objects out of windows, including Christmas trees. Vacant apartments were turned into drug hangouts, and stairwells became violent crime areas.

In 1993, the projects were renovated slightly, but problems continued. They closed in 1998 and 1999 and were imploded on February 10, 2001.

== Background ==
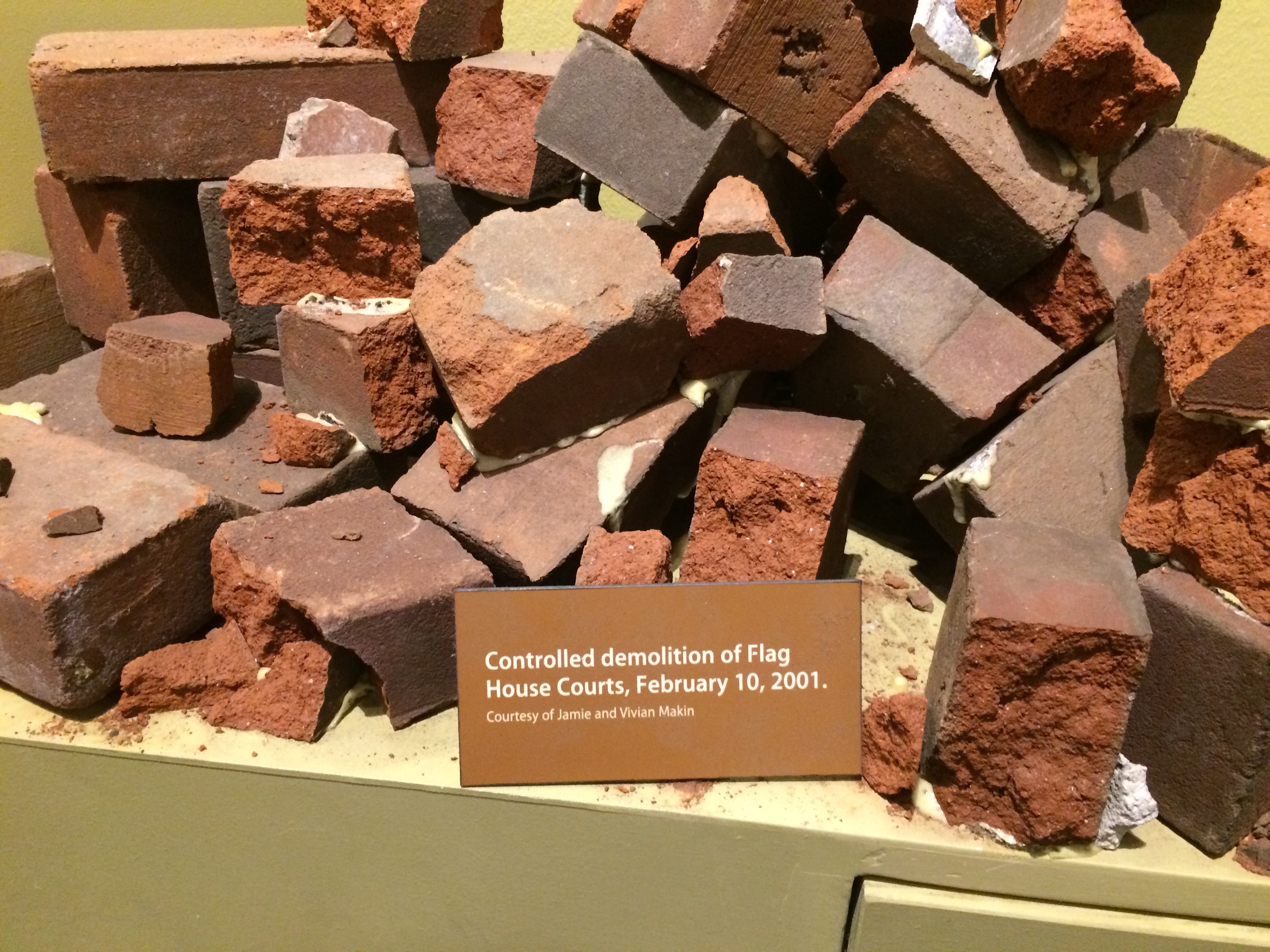
Bricks from the controlled demolition of Flag House Courts on display in the Jewish Museum of Maryland

The Flag House homes were located in the Jonestown section of Southeast Baltimore North of Little Italy and East of downtown bounded by Pratt Street on the South, Baltimore Street on the North, Central Avenue on the East and President Street on the West. At the time of their construction, the area housed a diverse mix of people living in rowhouses. City officials declared the area blighted and opened the Flag House Courts in 1955. The project included three large high-rise apartment buildings and 15 low-rise buildings. The property initially opened with a mixed population of residents. Six years later, a majority of the population residing there was black.

== In popular culture ==
- In an episode of The Wire, Ellis Carver mentions growing up in the Flag House Projects.
- The Flaghouse Homes are shown in Homicide: Life on the Street in episodes 6.1-6.3, the three part sixth-season premiere titled as "Blood Ties". They are mistakenly called the Perkins Homes, a nearby housing project. This is proven in the following manner: The Flaghouse Homes were North of Little Italy across Pratt Street unlike the Perkins Homes which are east of Little Italy across Central Avenue. Additionally, the Flaghouse Homes were high-rise buildings as depicted on the show unlike the Perkins Homes which are no more than three stories high at any given location.

== Bibliography ==
- Hayward, Mary Ellen and Charles Belfoure (2001). The Baltimore Rowhouse. Princeton: Princeton Architectural Press.
- O'Donnell, John (1996). "City housing officials pick team to head Flag House Courts project; Complex will be leveled, replaced with 260 units." Baltimore Sun. June 3.
- Valentine, Paul (1995). "2nd High-Rise to Go." Washington Post. December 4.
