= Culmer Place =

Public housing complex in Miami, Florida

- Interactive map of Culmer Place

General information
- Location: NW 11th Street, NW 10th Street, NW 8th Street, NW 7th Street Overtown, Miami, Florida
- Coordinates: 25.78297°N 80.20551°W
- No. of units: 151

Construction
- Constructed: 1977

Other information
- Governing body: Miami-Dade County Housing Public Agency

Culmer Place, locally known as The Swamps or Swamp City is a 151-unit public housing complex in the Overtown neighborhood of Miami, Florida, originally constructed in 1977. It was located adjacent to the Culmer Gardens public housing complex.
