= Bay View Houses =

Public housing development in Brooklyn, New York

Bayview Houses
- NYCHA property
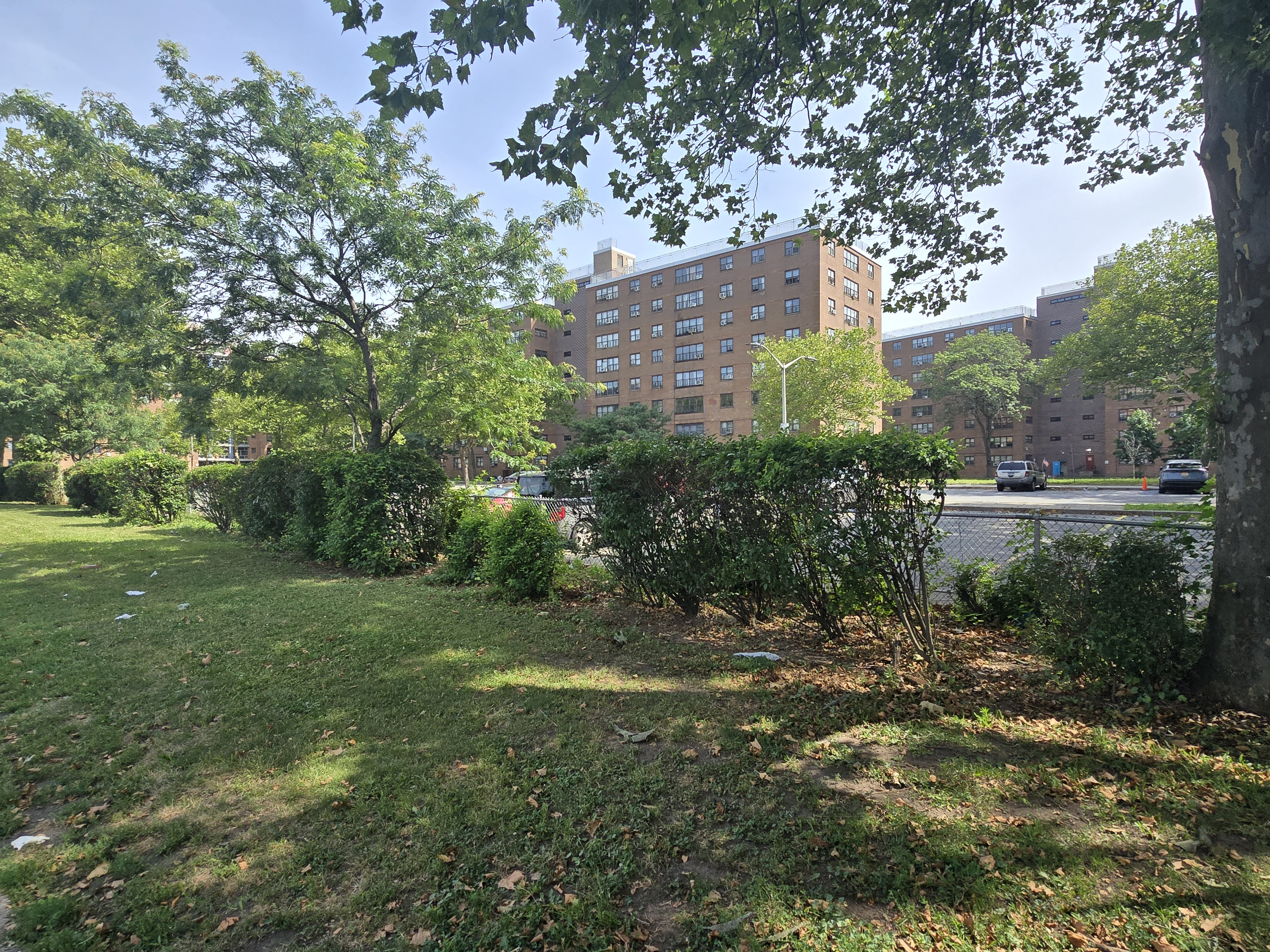
- Interactive map of Bayview Houses
- Coordinates: 40.634610°N 73.887920°W
- Country: United States
- State: New York
- City: New York City
- Borough: Brooklyn

Area
  - Total: 0.053 sq mi (0.14 km^{2})

Population
  - Total: 3,578
  - Density: 68,000/sq mi (26,000/km^{2})
- ZIP codes: 11236
- Area codes: 718, 347, 929, and 917
- Website: my.nycha.info/DevPortal/

The Bayview Houses is a housing project of the New York City Housing Authority in the Canarsie neighborhood of Brooklyn. It has twenty-three, 8-story buildings with 1,609 apartments. The 34.02-acre complex is bordered by Seaview Avenue, East 102nd Street, Shore and Rockaway Parkways. The project was listed on the National Register of Historic Places in 2026.

== History ==
Construction on the Bay View Houses began in November 1954 and was completed on June 7, 1956. It was designed for middle-income families to keep these residents from moving to the suburbs. The Bayview Houses was mostly inhabited by low- to middle-income working class New Yorkers.

The development was designed in the superblock style which bounds the property with local roads and without roads crossing. The buildings take up roughly 14% of the site to ensure green space, typical of the time. This design ignores the surrounding environment, particularly the view of Jamaica Bay from the buildings. Located in the center of the development is the Bay View Houses Farm, managed by East New York Farms.

The development is currently in the process of becoming converted into RAD PACT Section 8 Management where there will be a public-private partnership between NYCHA and private companies to manage the development in order to bring in the capital funding needed to revitalize and upgrade the development into better conditions.

== Notable residents ==
- John Brockington (born 1948), former NFL player
- Steven Keats (1945–1994), actor
- John Salley (born 1964), former NBA player and the first player to win an NBA championship on three different teams
- Howard Schultz (born 1953), former CEO of Starbucks

== See also ==
- New York City Housing Authority
- List of New York City Housing Authority properties
