= Perkins Homes, Baltimore =

Public housing development located in Baltimore, Maryland, United States

Coordinates: 39°17′16″N 76°35′46.7″W

Perkins Homes
- Neighborhood of Baltimore
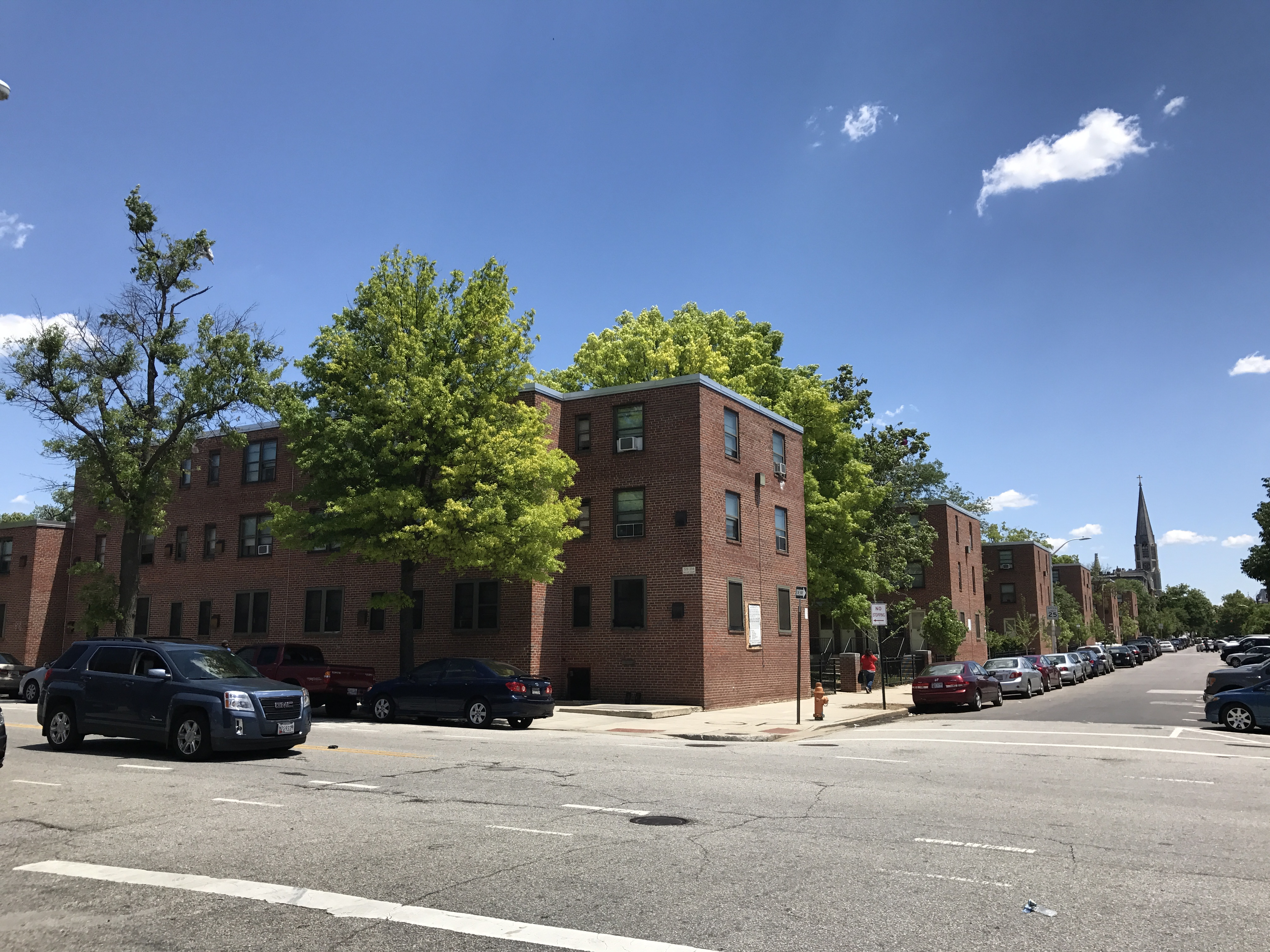
- Perkins Homes at the corner of Bank Street and S. Caroline Street in Baltimore

- Location within Baltimore Location within Maryland Location within the United States
- Country: United States
- State: Maryland
- City: Baltimore
- Time zone: UTC−5 (Eastern)
  - Summer (DST): UTC−4 (EDT)
- Area Codes: 410, 443, 667

Perkins Homes was a former public housing development in Southeast Baltimore, located between Fells Point and Little Italy and bounded by Pratt Street to the north, Eden Street on the west, Dallas Street on the east, and Bank Street to the south. Constructed in 1942, the community was located within the East Harbor Empowerment Zone of the Fells Point area, and was one of the oldest housing projects in southeast Baltimore. The housing project tenants were about 91% African-American, 7% Puerto Rican, and 2% white prior to relocation and demolition.

City Springs Elementary School is located at South Caroline and East Pratt Streets. Lombard Junior High School and First Apostolic Institution Church are nearby.

In 2019, the Housing Authority of Baltimore City received $30 million in federal funding to demolish Perkins Homes. Current plans are for a new mixed-use community of replacement public housing and market rate apartments.

== Perkins Homes Redevelopment Project ==
The new Perkins Homes Redevelopment will consist of 788 total units; 377 "deeply affordable units", 155 tax-credit units, and 256 market-rate units. Construction will take place over 5 phases:

• Perkins 1 103 units

• Perkins 2 156 units

• Perkins 3 151 units

• Perkins 4 153 units

• Perkins 5 225 units

No set timeframe has been given for the completion of this project.

== In the media ==
In Homicide: Life on the Street, fictional detective Al Giardello was raised in the Perkins Homes, as it was the neighborhood inhabited by his mother's side of the family. Giardello's father's side of the family was from the neighboring Little Italy. The Perkins Homes are also mistakenly shown as the now-demolished Flaghouse Homes.
