= Wyckoff Gardens =

Public housing development in Brooklyn, New York

Wyckoff Gardens Houses
- NYCHA Property
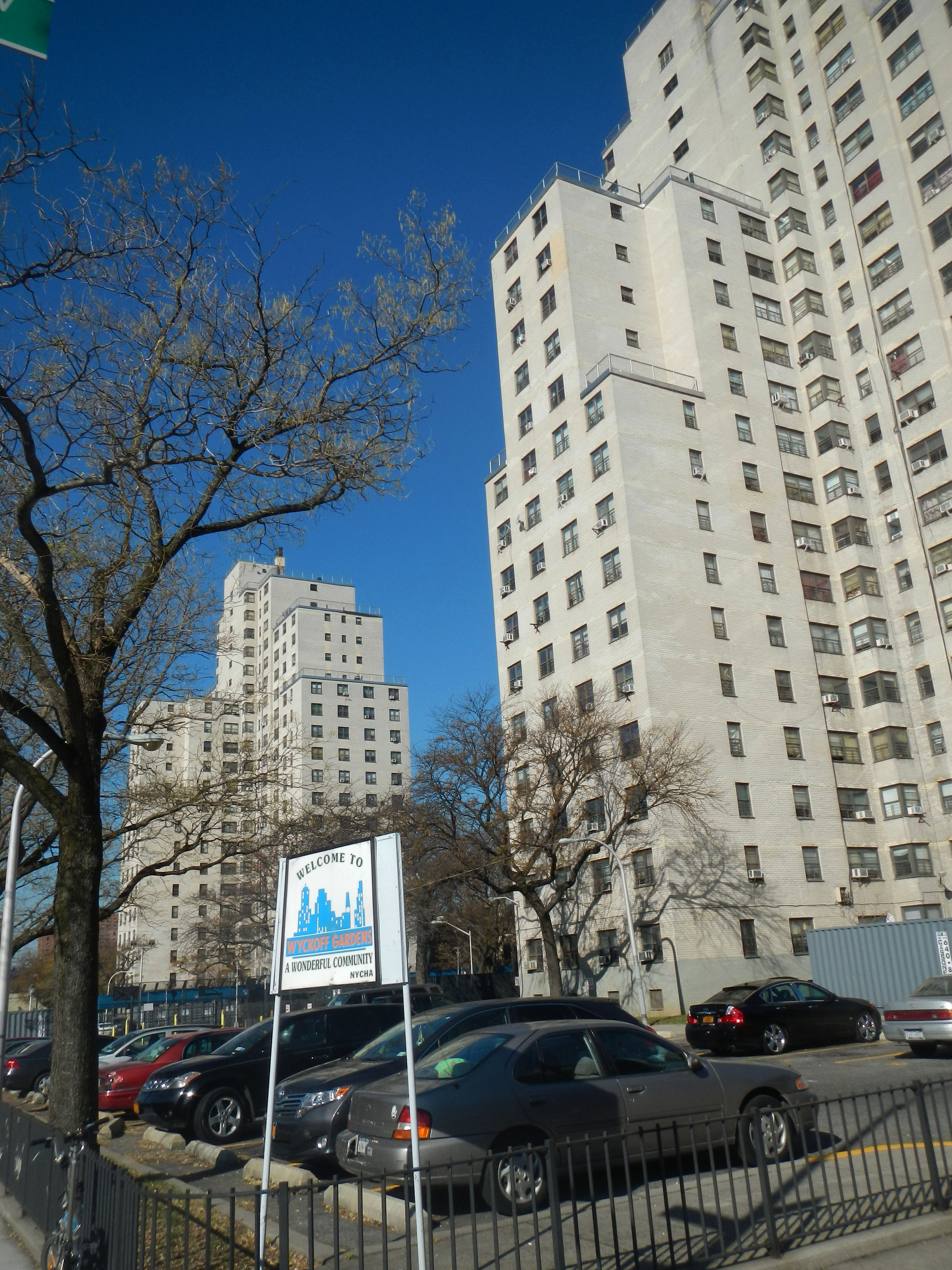
- Interactive map of Wyckoff Gardens Houses
- Coordinates: 40.6826°N 73.9838°W
- Country: United States
- State: New York
- City: New York City
- Borough: Brooklyn

Area
  - Total: 5.81 acres (2.35 ha)

Population
  - Total: 988
- Zip Code: 11217

The Wyckoff Gardens Houses is a NYCHA housing complex that has three buildings each containing 21 stories. It is located between Nevins Street and 3rd Avenue and also between Wyckoff to Baltic Streets that sits on 5.81 acres (2.35 ha) in the Boerum Hill neighborhood in Brooklyn.

== History ==
This housing complex was completed in December 1966. It was designed by the architectural firm of Greenberg & Ames.

=== 21st Century ===
In October 2022, there was a report of the complex's visioning session about the Gowanus Rezoning Plan. As part of it, around $200M is invested at Gowanus Houses and this complex.

In July 2024, the selection of a design-build team by NYCHA, Mega/Technico Joint Venture, will conduct a renovation for both Gowanus Houses and this complex for $216M.

== See also ==
- New York City Housing Authority
