= Glenny Drive Apartments =

Public housing project in Buffalo, US

Kensington Heights
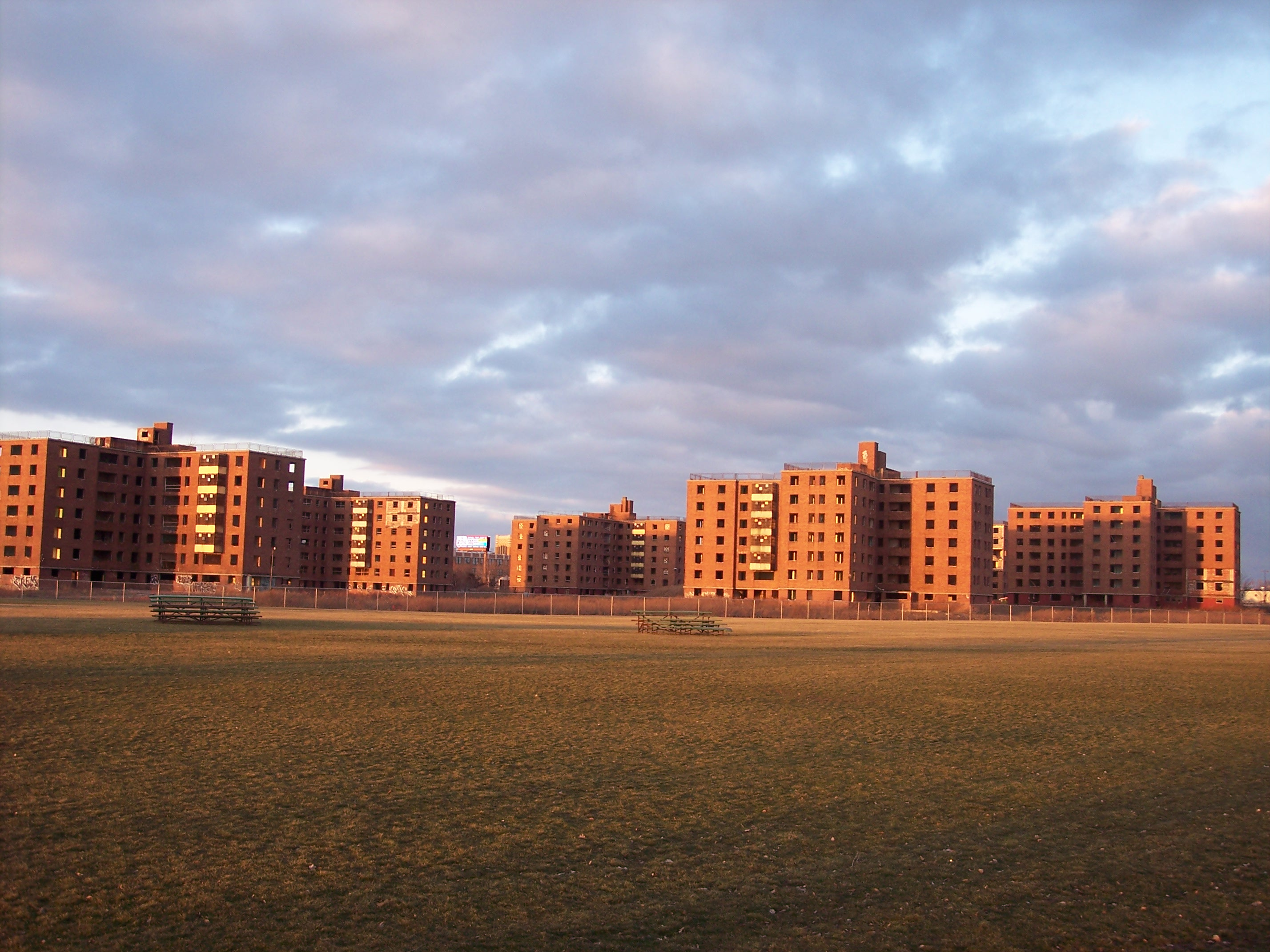
- 2012 photograph
- Interactive map of Kensington Heights

General information
- Location: Buffalo, New York; United States
- Coordinates: 42°55′33.54″N 78°50′12.85″W
- Status: Demolished

Construction
- Constructed: 1955-1958

Listing
- Demolished: 2009–2018

Other information
- Governing body: Buffalo Municipal Housing Authority

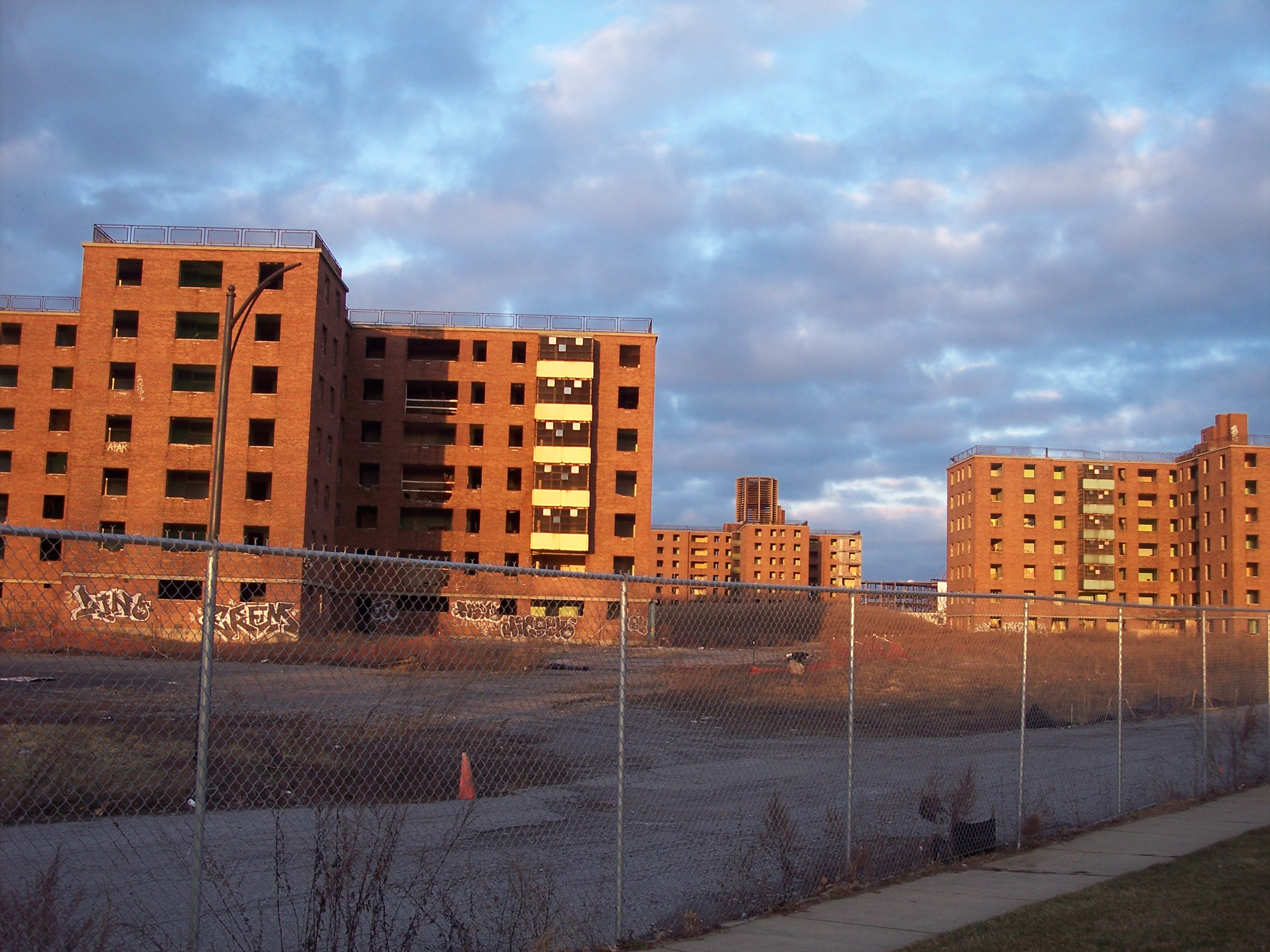
Decayed buildings, 2012

The Glenny Drive Apartments (also known as Kensington Heights or Kensington Towers) were a Buffalo, New York, public housing project built during the expansion of public housing in the United States in the 1950s.

== History ==
Kensington Heights was announced in 1954 with construction beginning the following year. Local Buffalo architect Milton Milstein designed the project. It was finished and opened for occupancy in early 1958. Previously, a quarry and then temporary post-World War II housing occupied the parcel of land the project was built on. Kensington Heights consisted of six seven-story brick and concrete apartment buildings, each containing approximately 67 units. It was spread across 12 acres (5 ha) and located next to the Kensington Expressway (New York State Route 33) and behind the Erie County Medical Center. The project was built by New York State using bonds and owned, managed and maintained by the Buffalo Municipal Housing Authority.

During the construction of the Kensington Expressway, any family displaced was given priority in the project.

== End of use ==
With reduced federal funding and increased operating and utility cost, maintenance began to suffer and living conditions began to decline by the mid-1970s. In 1975, the buildings' incinerators were ordered shut down by the Erie County Health Department due to pollution concerns. They were replaced by one outside dumpster per building. This frustrated tenants, especially those on the upper floors. As a result, litter and ensuing infestation became major problems. Crime and vandalism also increased substantially during this period. By the end of the 1970s, Kensington Heights had a vacancy rate of 64.7% (240 vacancies out of 371 available units). In 1980, a relocation plan was approved, and the remaining residents were relocated. The site remained abandoned for nearly three decades, becoming significantly deteriorated and further vandalized in the process. Demolition began in 2009 but was quickly stopped after concerns about asbestos removal in the buildings. Demolition resumed in 2012. The Buffalo Municipal Housing Authority put the property for sale in July 2016 with one tower still standing. Erie County Medical Center purchased the property in 2017 and demolished the last tower in October 2018. As of 2025 a portion of the site is used by ECMC for parking.

== See also ==
- Cabrini–Green, Chicago, Illinois
- Pruitt–Igoe, St. Louis, Missouri
- List of public housing developments in the United States
