= Coney Island Houses =

Public housing in Brooklyn, New York

- NYCHA Property
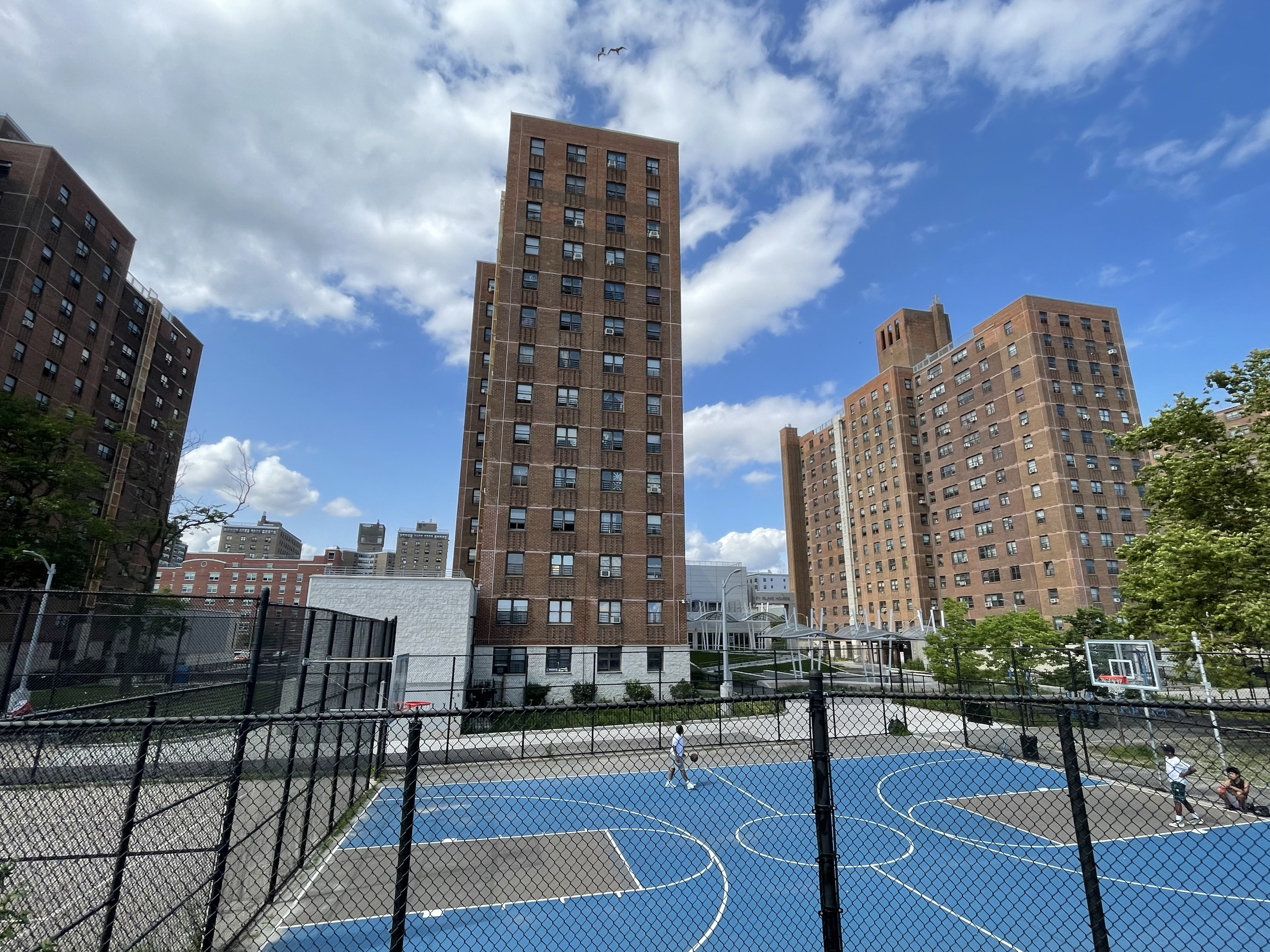
- Interactive map of Coney Island Houses
- Coordinates: 40.5723°N 73.9963°W
- Country: United States
- State: New York
- City: New York City
- Borough: Brooklyn

Area
  - Total: 5.52 acres (2.23 ha)

Population
  - Total: 989
- Zip code: 11224

Coney Island Houses are a NYCHA housing complex with five 14-story buildings. It is located between West 29th to 32nd Streets and in front of Surf Avenue, in Coney Island, Brooklyn. It is home to 989 residents as of 2025 and it is near the Coney Island Beach.

== History ==
The buildings were completed in February 1957. The complex was designed by architect Harry M. Prince.

=== 21st Century ===
In 2012, these buildings were flooded and damaged during Hurricane Sandy and the buildings systems, facades, and its rooftops were up to severely damaged caused by winds, flooding, and the sand and salt water infiltrations. Twin Peaks Inc. had decided to provide some special inspections and material testing services during the repair and remediation on this complex and build a new 2-story boiler plant that has an area of 2100-square-foot.

In 2024, the Public Engagement for this and Unity Plaza Site 1B are part of "24 in 24" by Eric Adams that runs from July 17th to August 15th for resident to vote online or mailing. It as estimated to have 20-year capital need of over $230M for this complex while Site 1B needs of $83M.

== See also ==
- New York City Housing Authority
