= Pelham Parkway Houses =

- NYCHA Property
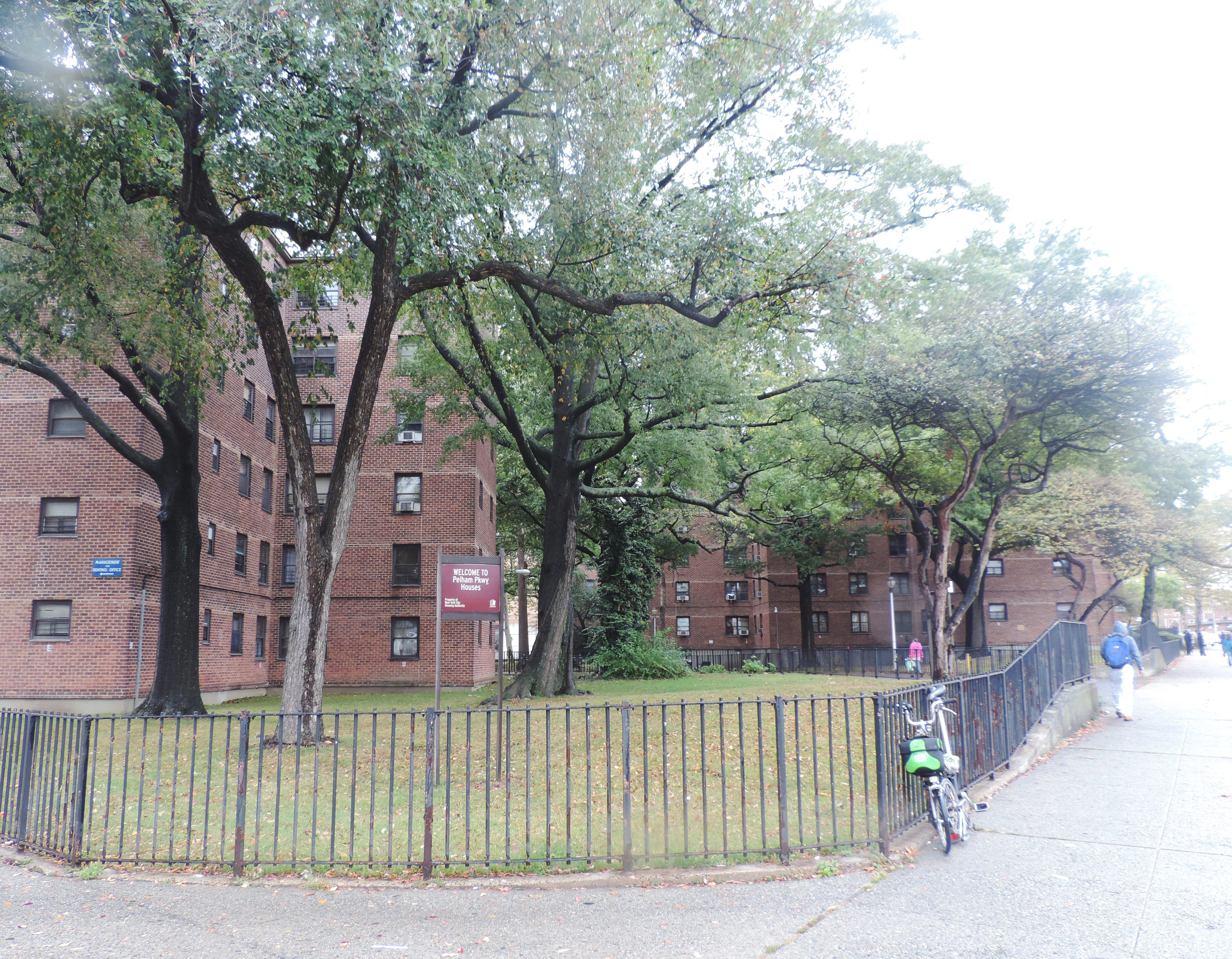
- Interactive map of Pelham Parkway Houses
- Country: United States
- State: New York
- City: New York City
- Borough: The Bronx

Area
  - Total: 22.3 acres (9.0 ha)

Population
  - Total: 2,297
- Zip Codes: 10467 and 10469

Pelham Parkway Houses is a New York City Housing Authority (NYCHA) housing complex that consists of 23 six-story buildings. Buildings I–IX are located between Mace and Waring avenues and also between Bronxwood Avenue to Williamsbridge Road. Buildings X–XV are located between Waring and Astor avenues and also between Paulding Avenue and Williamsbridge Road. Buildings XVI–XXIII are located between Astor Avenue and Pelham Parkway West and also between Wallace to Bronxwood Avenues. All of these buildings are located in the Pelham Parkway section in The Bronx.

== History ==
These buildings were all completed in June 1950. The complex was designed by the architectural firm of Rogers & Butler.

In 2014, there were plans to add 375 security cameras two years after the original city funding was approved in the wake of a murder in the complex.
