= James E. Scott Carver Homes =

Public housing project in the Liberty City neighborhood of Miami

Scott-Carver Homes
- Interactive map of Scott-Carver Homes

General information
- Location: Bordered by NW 79th Street, NW 62nd Street, NW 17th Avenue and NW 22nd Avenue; Miami, Florida; United States
- Coordinates: 25.8418655°N 80.2330266°W
- No. of units: 850

Construction
- Constructed: 1953-1955

Listing
- Demolished: Starting in 1999 and fully demolished in 2001

Other information
- Governing body: Miami-Dade County Public Housing Agency

James E. Scott-Carver Homes, often shortened to Scott-Carver Homes or Scott Projects was a public housing project in the Liberty City neighborhood of Miami, Florida, US. Constructed in 1953 and demolished in 1999, it was the largest single public housing complex in Miami-Dade County at 850 units. Built adjacent to the Scott-Carver complex across 50 acres (20 ha), it is historically one of the largest public housing projects in Florida.
