= Robbins Plaza =

Public housing development in Manhattan, New York

- NYCHA Property
- Interactive map of Robbins Plaza
- Country: United States
- State: New York
- City: New York City
- Borough: Manhattan

Area
  - Total: 0.31 acres (0.13 ha)

Population
  - Total: 164
- Zip Code: 10021

Robbins Plaza is a 20-story New York City Housing Authority apartment building. It is located at the corner of 70th Street and 1st Avenue on the Upper East Side of Manhattan.

== History ==
Plans for construction of the building were filed by architect Carl Puchall in 1971; the building was completed February 1975.

The housing project was named after Ira S. Robbins in April 1981. Robbins, who died in 1978, was a national leader in the field of public housing and served as president of the National Housing Conference from 1951 to 1957 and as one of NYCHA's three commissioners from 1958 to 1970.

In 1996, a rupture in an underground steam pipe adjacent to Robbins Plaza forced the evacuation of 56 apartments in the building due to asbestos contamination.

In 2018, Robbins Plaza along with Holmes Towers and the Isaacs Houses—all NYCHA-run developments on the Upper East Side—ranked among the worst in the nation after federal inspections by the United States Department of Housing and Urban Development.

In December 2025, NYCHA released a Request for Expressions of Interest (RFEI) that solicits proposals for about $2.5B for 27 housing projects including this building and is grouped in one of the three clusters for Permanent Affordability Commitment Together (PACT).

== See also ==
- New York City Housing Authority
