= St. Nicholas Houses =

Public housing development in Manhattan, New York

- NYCHA property
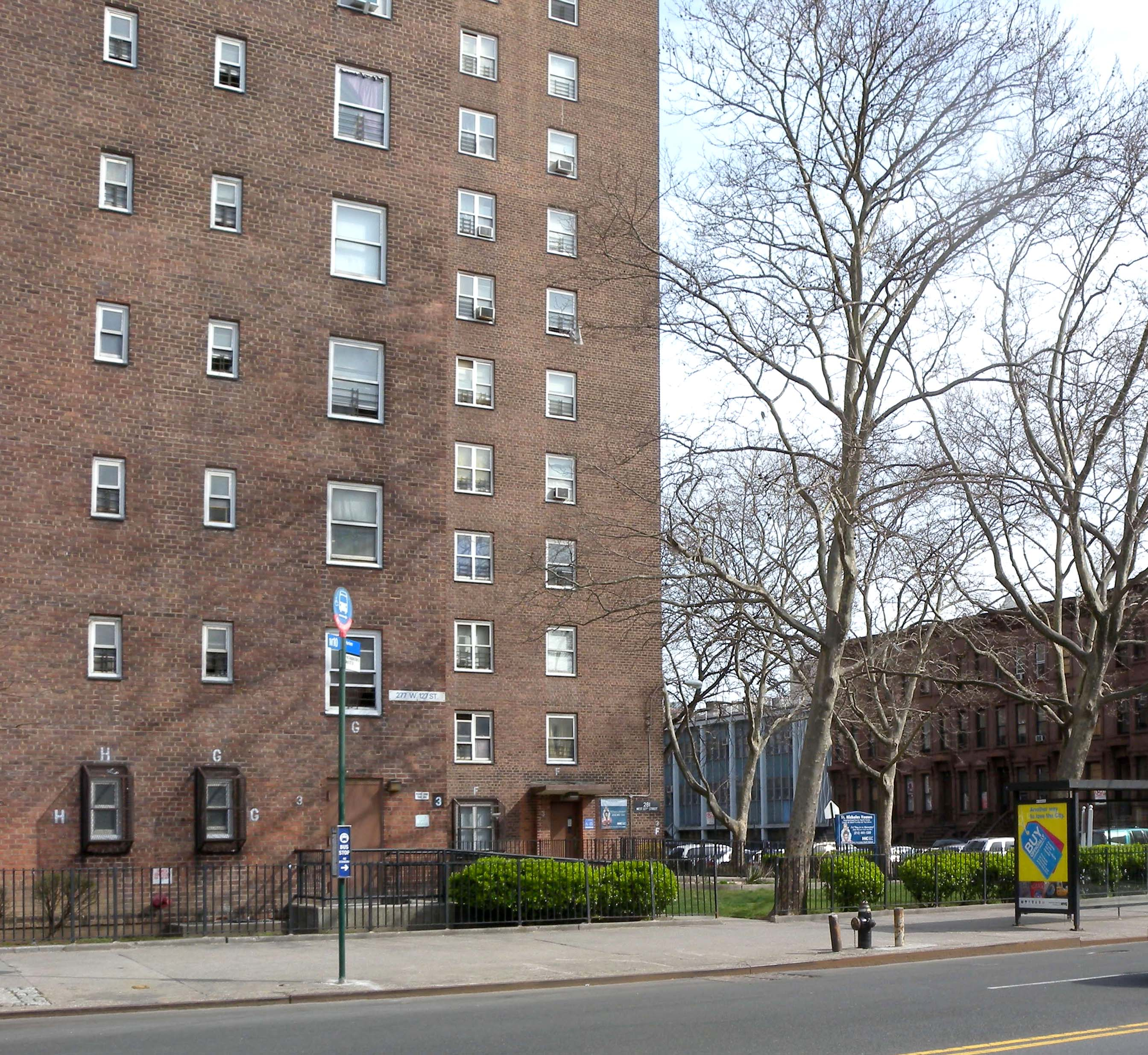
- Location in New York City
- Coordinates: 40.810540°N 73.948110°W
- Country: United States
- State: New York
- City: New York City
- Borough: Manhattan

Area
  - Total: 0.024 sq mi (0.062 km^{2})

Population
  - Total: 3,525
  - Density: 150,000/sq mi (57,000/km^{2})
- Zip codes: 10027
- Area codes: 212, 332, 646, and 917
- Website: my.nycha.info/DevPortal/

St. Nicholas Houses or "Saint Nick," is a public housing project in Central Harlem, in the borough of Manhattan, New York City and are managed by the New York City Housing Authority (NYCHA). The project is located between Adam Clayton Powell Jr. Boulevard and Frederick Douglass Boulevard, spanning a superblock from 127th Street to 131st Street. The project consists of thirteen 14-story buildings containing 1,523 apartment units.

== Development ==
The site formerly consisted of city blocks with small attached homes in poor condition, and existing residents were removed via a slum clearance program. In 1952, the first tenants began moving in and the development was completed on September 30, 1954 under the Taft-Ellender-Wagner Housing Act of 1949. When the houses initially began seeking applicants, World War II veterans received priority.

From 1947 to 1953, the playground at the St. Nicholas Houses on 128th Street and Seventh Avenue was the site of the Ruckers tournament until it was moved to a larger playground on 130th Street in 1954. While at the playground, Holcombe Rucker developed the tournament into five divisions: girls, junior high school, high school, college and pro.

By the mid-1970s, violence had risen in the development and security had decreased along with repairs.

In 2011, NYCHA approved the sale of 3.1 acres for the demolition of a playground on the site for the construction of a charter school called Promise Academy Charter School. Residents planned to sue the city and federal governments over the green space demolition, challenging that NYCHA failed to properly assess the school's impact on the development. Residents also felt that they were not informed of the plan until after the deal was completed. The school was designed by John Ciardullo Associates and completed in 2013.

== In books ==
The St. Nicholas Houses is one of the main settings in the book The Stars Beneath Our Feet.

== Notable residents ==
- Teddy Riley (born 1967), singer, songwriter, record producer credited with the creation of the new jack swing genre

== See also ==
- New York City Housing Authority
