= Jesse Powell Towers =

Public housing tower in Little Rock, Arkansas

- U.S. National Register of Historic Places
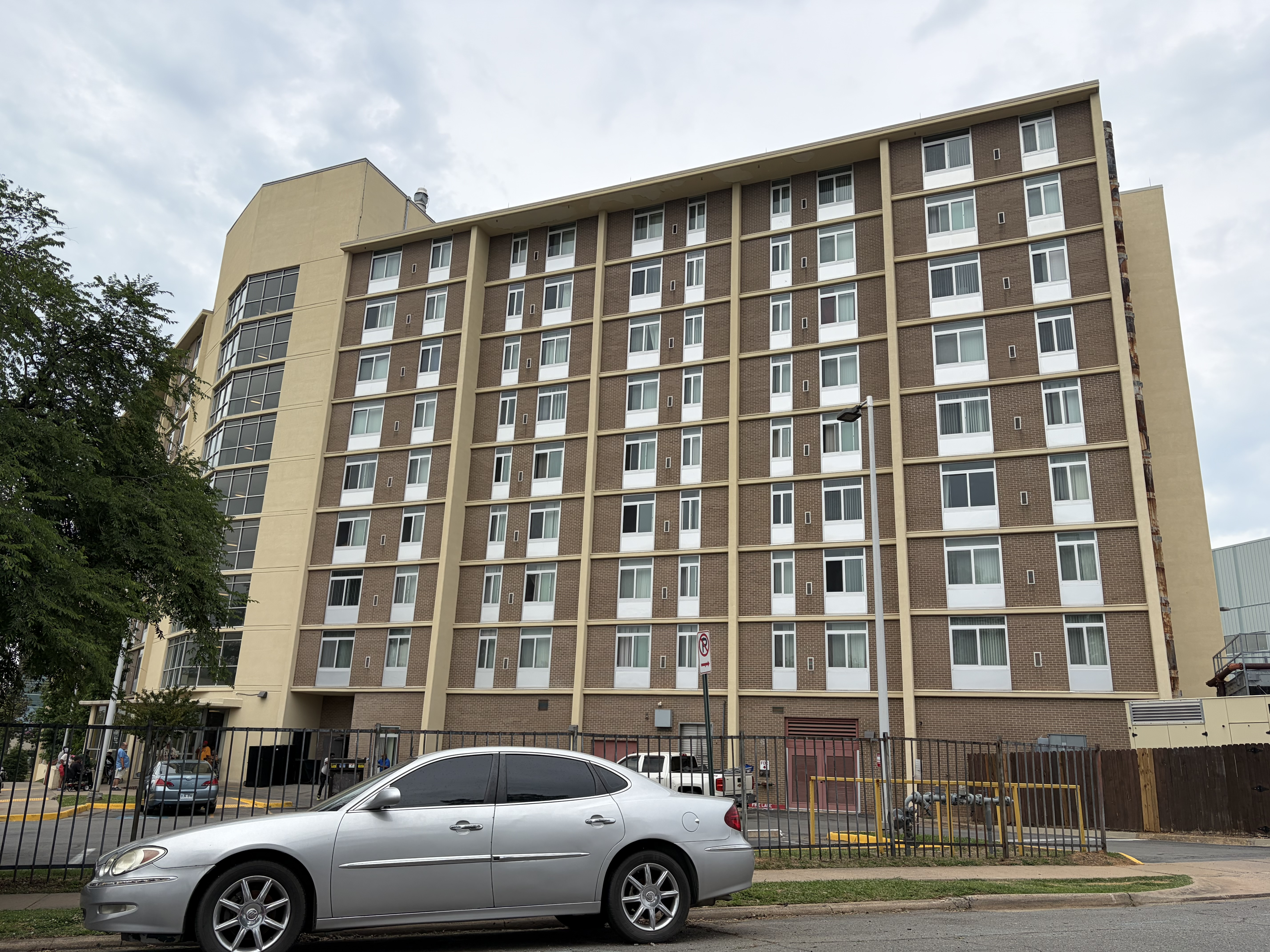
- Powell Towers in 2026

- Location within Arkansas Location within the United States
- Location: 1010 Wolfe St., Little Rock, Arkansas
- Coordinates: 34°44′28″N 92°17′34″W
- Area: 1.8 acres (0.73 ha)
- Built: 1974
- Architect: Stowers & Stowers
- Architectural style: International Style
- NRHP reference No.: 100000708
- Added to NRHP: March 7, 2017

The Jesse Powell Towers are a residential apartment highrise at 1010 Wolfe Street in Little Rock, Arkansas. The nine-story tall building is located directly across from Arkansas Children's Hospital on 5th Street. Built in 1975, it is a nine-story skyscraper, with a steel frame clad in brick and concrete, housing 169 residential units. It was designed by Stowers & Stowers for the city as public senior housing. It exemplifies a design principle espoused by Le Corbusier known as the "tower in a park", with a large landscaped green area surrounding the building.

The apartments were listed on the National Register of Historic Places in 2017.

== See also ==
- National Register of Historic Places listings in Little Rock, Arkansas
