= Mariners Harbor Houses =

Public housing development in Staten Island, New York

Coordinates: 40°37′57″N 74°09′49″W

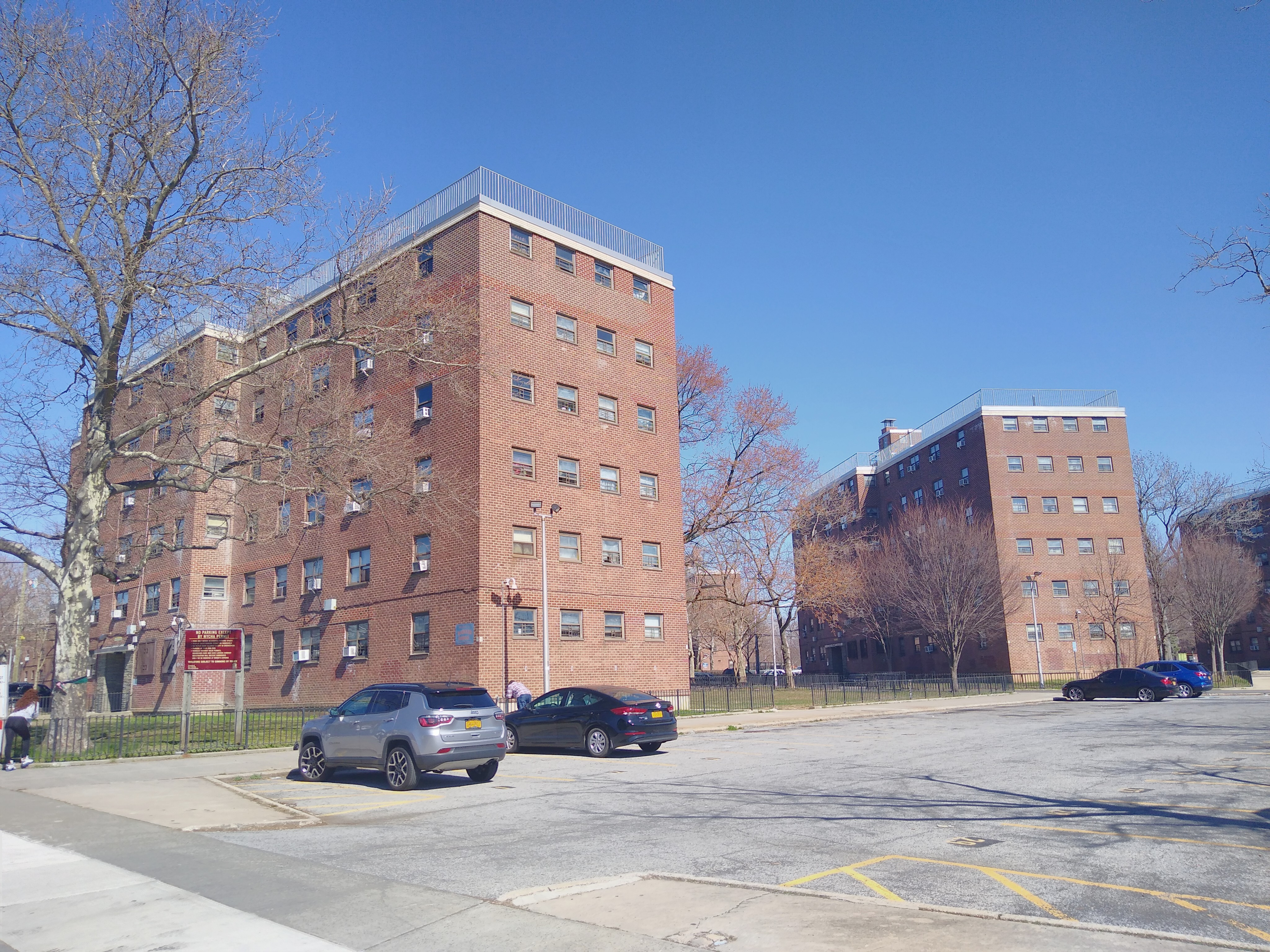
From Grandview Avenue

The Mariners Harbor Houses are a public housing complex built and operated by the New York City Housing Authority and located in the Mariners Harbor neighborhood of Staten Island, New York City. It was completed in September 1954. Consisting of 22 three and six-story buildings, it contains 607 apartments housing some 1,333 residents. It is bordered by Lockman Avenue, Roxbury Street, Grandview Avenue, and Continental Place. Brabant Street runs through the complex. It is located within the boundaries of Staten Island's 121st Police Precinct.

The Mariners Harbor Houses are the westernmost public housing development in New York City.
