= Holmes Towers =

Public housing development in Manhattan, New York

- NYCHA property
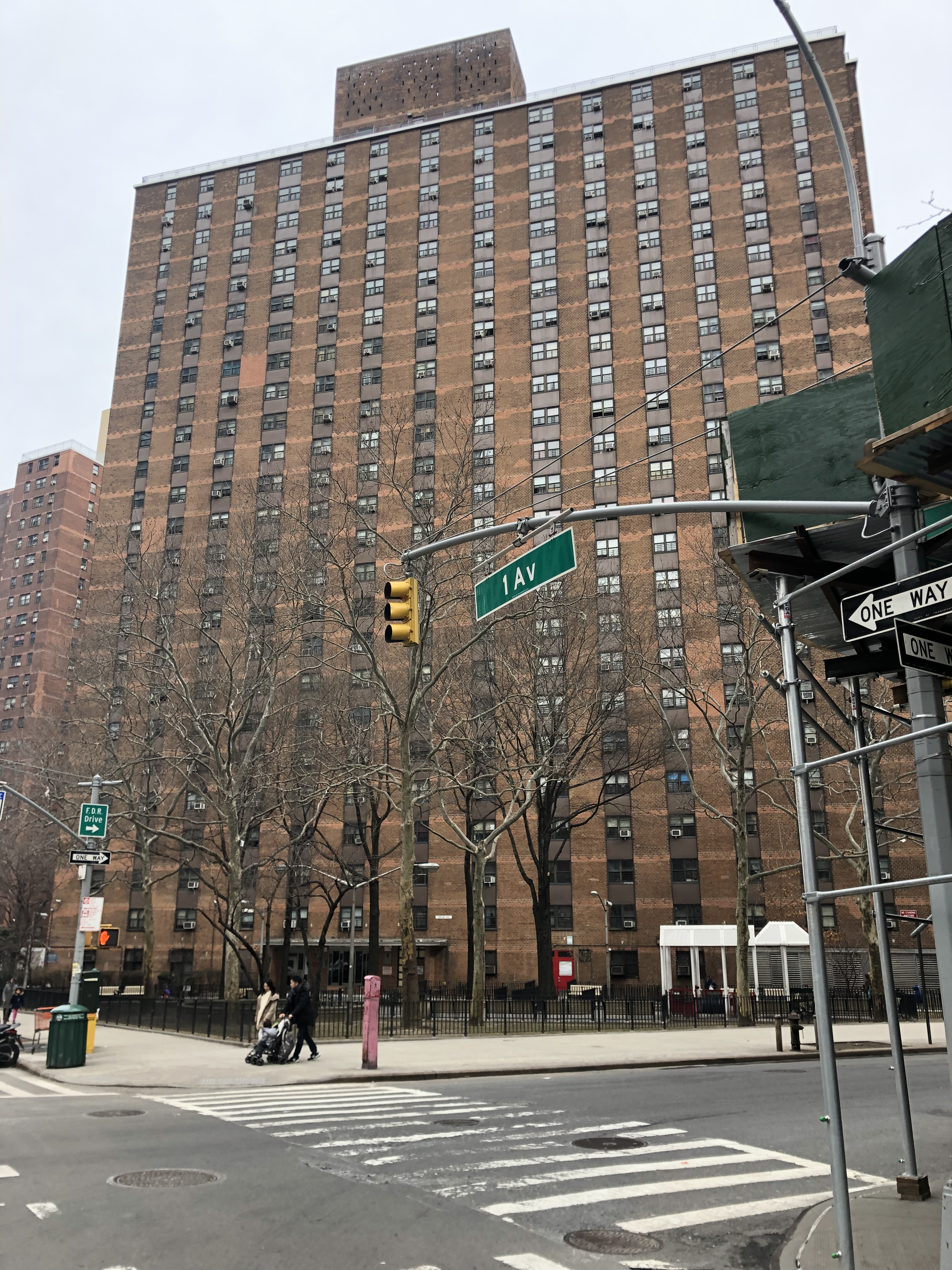
- Holmes Towers in 2019
- Interactive map of Holmes Towers
- Coordinates: 40.781319°N 73.948110°W
- Country: United States
- State: New York
- City: New York City
- Borough: Manhattan

Area
  - Total: 0.004 sq mi (0.010 km^{2})

Population
  - Total: 951
  - Density: 240,000/sq mi (92,000/km^{2})
- ZIP codes: 10128
- Area codes: 212, 332, 646, and 917
- Website: my.nycha.info/DevPortal/

The John Haynes Holmes Towers is a public housing project for low income residents of the Yorkville section of the Upper East Side located just south of the neighborhood's northern limit at 96th Street, in New York City, New York, United States. The neighboring Isaacs Houses and the Holmes Towers border East Harlem, which has the second highest concentration of public housing in the United States. The two public housing buildings, designed by Architects Eggers and Higgins, were completed in 1969, are 25 stories tall and contain 537 apartments. The project is located between 92nd and 93rd Streets from 1st Avenue to York Avenue and the FDR Drive.

The development was named for the founder of the Community Church of New York. John Haynes Holmes was known as a pacifist, social organizer, and social justice pioneer.

== History ==
As of 1973, the Towers were described as being home to white, elderly residents. 60 percent of the apartments in Holmes Towers are set aside for tenants over the age of 62.

The Isaacs Houses projects are located just north of the Holmes Towers. Both developments are considered one complex totaling 5 buildings having the same Development Management Office managed by New York City Housing Authority. They represent the only public housing on the Upper East Side. Both housing projects, as a whole, have been designated a "high crime zone" by the New York City Police Department's 19th precinct. Crime, however, is considered to be relatively minimal compared to the projects further north.

In 2018, the Holmes Towers along with Isaacs Houses and Robbins Plaza ranked the worst in the nation after federal inspections by the United States Department of Housing and Urban Development.

=== Public private partnership pilot ===
In 2015 it was announced that the complex's playground would be razed for a new mixed-use building under New York's NextGen program to help meet the capital needs of NYCHA. The 47-story tower was intended to be half affordable housing and half market rate housing with the lower-income tenants on the lower floors. Holmes Towers residents decried the plan, citing the lack of sunlight would lower their quality of life and lacked input in the plans, later staging a protest.

In order to build the towers, property developer and de Blasio donor Fetner Properties would lease the land from NYCHA for $25 million for 99-years, pocketing all rent, qualifying for $13 million in subsidies, and paying no property taxes. In 2019, Manhattan Borough President Gale Brewer sued Mayor Bill de Blasio and NYCHA to block the new tower. The lawsuit accused de Blasio of trying to use his power to push the towers through illegally by skirting zoning laws and not having the project go through Uniform Land Use Review Procedure (ULURP).

NYCHA withdrew the plan in 2019.

== See also ==
- New York City Housing Authority
- List of New York City Housing Authority properties
