= Riverside, Cambridge =

Coordinates: 42°22′4″N 71°6′53″W

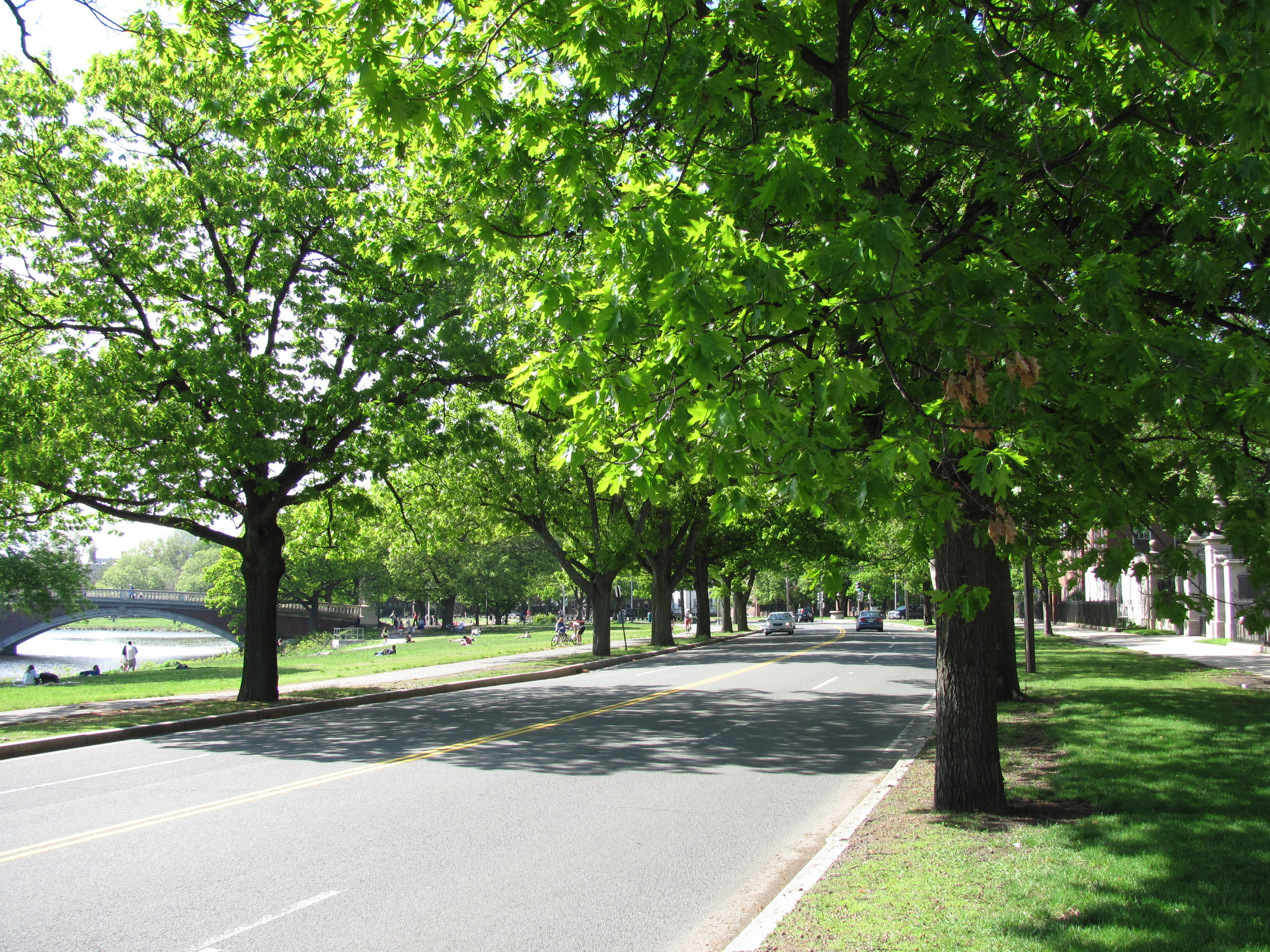
Memorial Drive

Riverside, also known as "Area 7", is a neighborhood of Cambridge, Massachusetts bounded by Massachusetts Avenue on the north, River Street on the east, the Charles River on the south, and JFK Street on the west. In 2005 it had a population of 11,201 residents in 3,341 households, and the average household income was $40,753.
