= Isaacs Houses =

Public housing development in Manhattan, New York

- NYCHA property
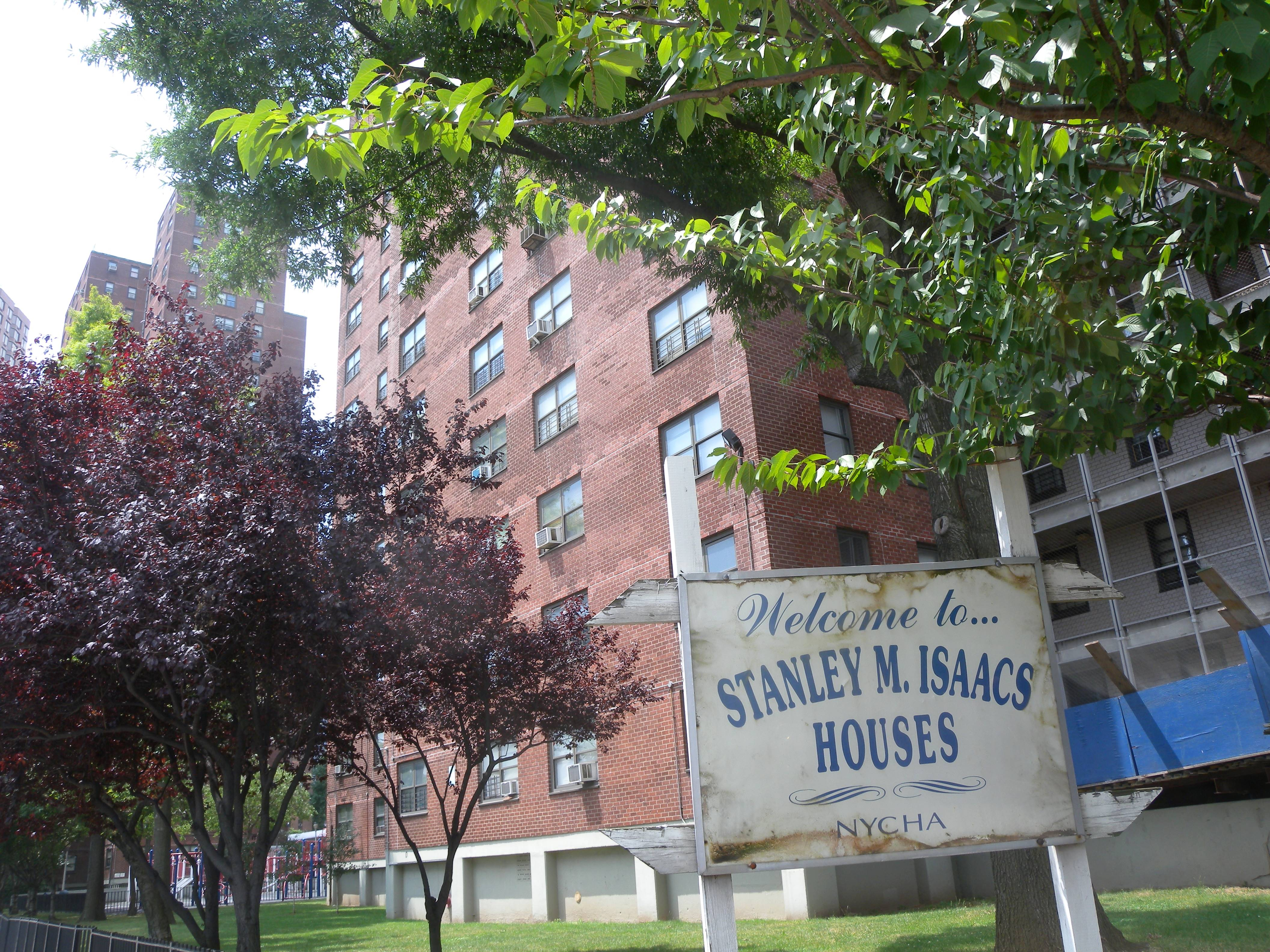
- Isaacs Houses in 2010
- Interactive map of Isaacs Houses
- Coordinates: 40.781320°N 73.945510°W
- Country: United States
- State: New York
- City: New York City
- Borough: Manhattan

Area
  - Total: 0.005 sq mi (0.013 km^{2})

Population
  - Total: 1,274
  - Density: 250,000/sq mi (98,000/km^{2})
- ZIP codes: 10128
- Area codes: 212, 332, 646, and 917
- Website: my.nycha.info/DevPortal/

The Stanley M. Isaacs Houses (or Isaacs Houses) is a public housing project for those of low to moderate incomes located just south of 96th Street in the Yorkville neighborhood of Manhattan in New York City. The Isaacs Houses and the Holmes Towers border East Harlem, which has the second highest concentration of public housing in New York City. The three public housing buildings are 24 stories tall and contain 635 apartments. The project is located between 93rd and 95th Streets with playground & ball courts from 95th-97th street, stretching from 1st Avenue to the FDR Drive.

== Development ==
The Isaacs Houses were designed by architects Frederick G. Frost Jr. & Associates and completed in 1965. They were originally called the Gerard Swope Houses but renamed in 1963 the Isaacs Houses after Stanley M. Isaacs, who served as Manhattan Borough President under Mayor LaGuardia and later on the New York City Council for 20 years, the last 12 of those years as minority leader. 45 percent of the apartments in Isaacs are set aside for tenants over the age of 62.

The development has been designated a "high crime zone" by the New York City Police Department's 19th precinct since the early 2000s, and are thus policed to a higher extent, especially due to the heavy socio-economic mixing of the immediate surrounding area, which includes public housing, working-class small tenement buildings, middle-class medium-size buildings, and upper-middle class to upper-class luxury buildings along 1st avenue in the area.

The housing project started as a community experiment by selecting many of the initial residents from the local Catholic parish, with assistance of Leyda Jimenez and other community ambassadors involved with the local Catholic Church. This created a tight-knit, low-crime community for the first few decades of the Isaac Houses’ history, and crime here is considered to be relatively minimal compared to the projects further north.

In 2018, the Isaacs Houses along with the Holmes Towers and Robbins Plaza, which are all run by the same managers, ranked the worst in the nation after federal inspections by the United States Department of Housing and Urban Development. Results have greatly improved since, with the Isaacs Houses now earning one of the highest scores in NYCHA's portfolio.

== See also ==
- New York City Housing Authority
- List of New York City Housing Authority properties
