= Washington Village (Norwalk, Connecticut) =

Coordinates: 41.0945°N 73.416°W

Washington Village, is a 136 unit public housing complex in the South Norwalk neighborhood of Norwalk, Connecticut, United States, in the block bound by Water Street, Raymond Street, Day Street and Concord Street. It is the oldest public housing development in Connecticut, occupied since 1941. It was designed by Frank Bissell, an architect who had moved to Norwalk after having worked in the New York offices of Barber and Bissell.

Due to flood damage from Hurricane Sandy and increased demand for housing in the South Norwalk area, a major three-part reconstruction plan for Washington Village broke ground in 2016. The plan has involved phasing in the site's original 136 public housing units, as well as an additional 137 mixed use and market rate units. The project is scheduled to complete in 2021.

The South Norwalk area, locally referred to as SoNo, is seeing an increase in population in recent years, contrary to the state-wide population loss. In addition to it being one of the only walkable downtown neighborhoods in the City, the neighborhood features restaurants, a lively arts scene, the Maritime Aquarium, and seasonal celebrations. Nearby projects which have the same goal of improving access to housing include 19 Day Street, which features 20 affordable units in a new modular structure. Increased densification of the area may offer additional opportunities to increase the availability of urban open space on the nearby waterfront.

The project is led by New England–based Harriman Group. The developer, Trinity Washington Village Limited Partnership, has been working alongside the Norwalk Housing Authority to make a smooth transition for public housing renters. Also involved in the project is the quasi-governmental Norwalk Redevelopment Agency.

Funding for the Washington Village reconstruction was fulfilled in part by the U.S. Department of Housing and Urban Development’s $30 million Choice Neighborhoods grant. This increase in local affordable housing was part of a greater initiative by now-former Governor of Connecticut, Dan Malloy during his time in office, when 22,000 affordable units were created. The state likewise contributed towards this project's funding through the Bonding Commission and Connecticut's Housing Finance Authority's Low Income Housing Tax Credit Program.

As of August 13, 2019, the Norwalk Housing Authority approved minor changes to the final part of the project, which has been in accordance with the Norwalk Redevelopment Agency.

Additionally, urban densification efforts include the recent adjustment of zoning laws for parking by the City of Norwalk. The tightening of parking availability contrasts widespread availability in neighboring suburban areas.
