= Gowanus Houses =

Public housing in Brooklyn, New York

- NYCHA property
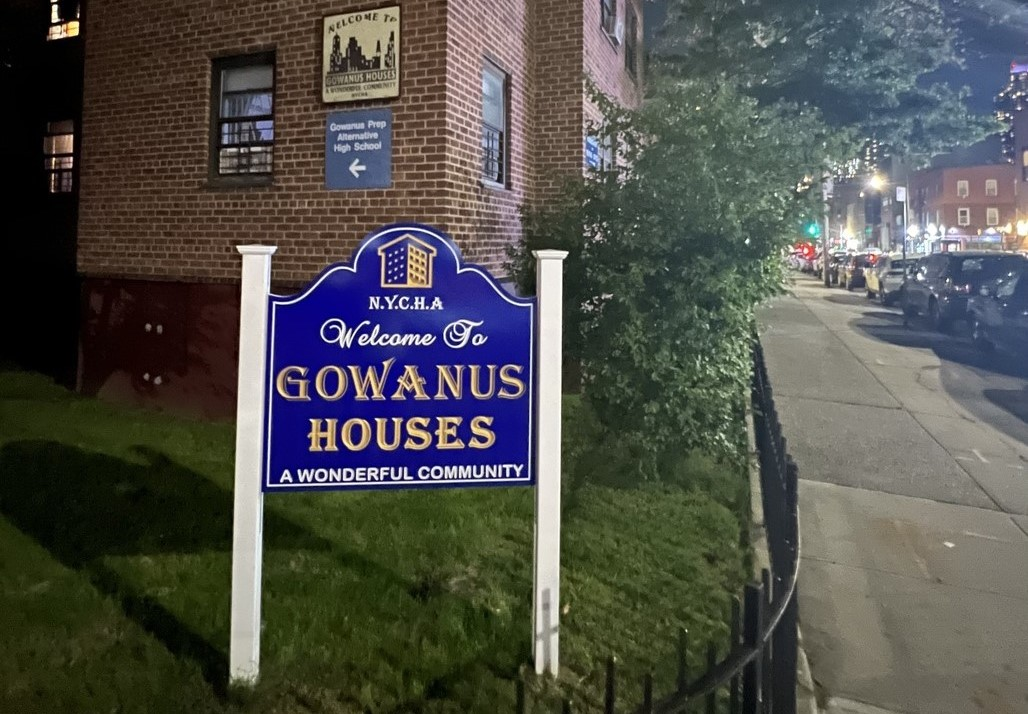
- Interactive map of Gowanus Houses
- Coordinates: 40.683700°N 73.989500°W
- Country: United States
- State: New York
- City: New York City
- Borough: Brooklyn

Area
  - Total: 0.0196 sq mi (0.051 km^{2})

Population
  - Total: 2,604
  - Density: 133,000/sq mi (51,300/km^{2})
- Zip code: 11217
- Area codes: 718, 347, and 929, and 917

The Gowanus Houses is a housing project of the New York City Housing Authority (NYCHA), located between Douglass and Wyckoff Streets & Bond and Hoyt Streets in both the Gowanus and Boerum Hill neighborhoods of Brooklyn. It sits on 12.57 acres (5.09 ha) of land, consisting of sixteen separate buildings. As of December 2022, the housing development accommodates over 2,600 residents in 1,139 apartment units. Buildings I, II, VI. (Note: Shorter Part of the Building Only.) VII, VIII, and IX has 6 floors, Buildings III, V, X, and XII has 4 floors, Building XI has 13 floors in both residential building parts, Buildings IV West and East, VI, (Note: Taller Part of the Building only.) VII, VIII, and IX has 14 floors, and Buildings XIII and XIV has 9 floors.

== History ==
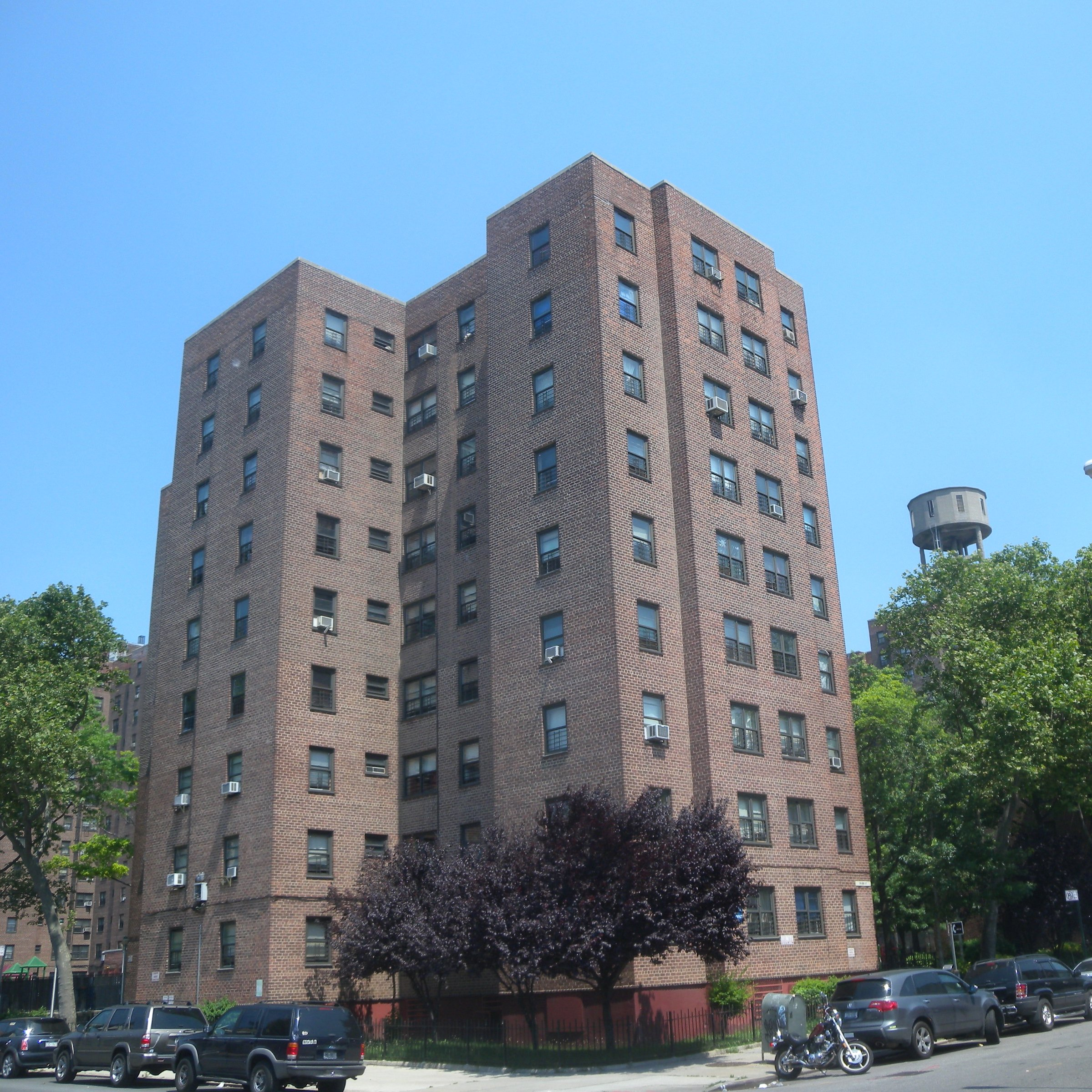
Gowanus Houses, from the corner of Bond and Douglass St

In 1944, NYCHA announced their plans to demolish the existing row houses on the blocks bounded by Hoyt, Bond, Douglass, and Wykoff Streets, to make way for a series of sixteen modernist towers, designed by William T. McCarthy, Rosario Candela, and Ely Jacques Kahn. By 1946, the land was cleared, however, due to a wartime restriction of materials, the project was delayed until 1948. In January of that year, NYCHA broke ground and the project was completed by June 1949. The development included a community center, playground, and public park.

This housing project was the setting for Spike Lee's 1995 film, Clockers, in which it was renamed the "Nelson Mandela Houses" for the movie.

In 2005, the Gowanus Houses Community Center was shuttered. However, following the recent rezoning & redevelopment of the Gowanus neighborhood, the community has secured the funds needed to reopen the center, along with other improvements.

== See also ==
- New York City Housing Authority
