= Gompers Houses =

Public housing development in Manhattan, New York

- NYCHA property
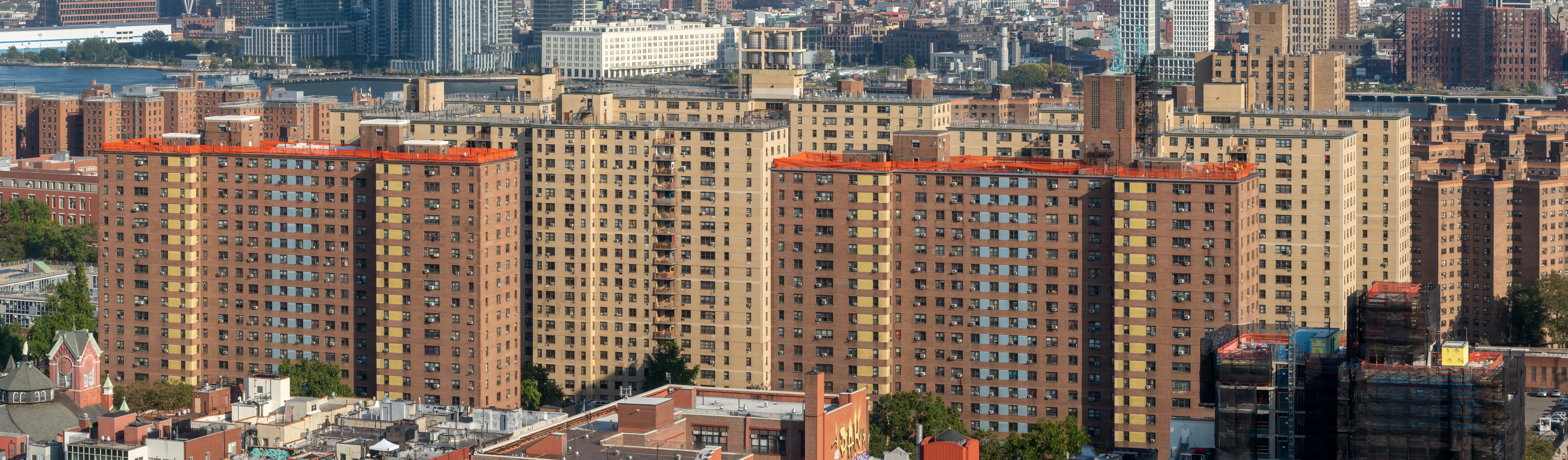
- Gompers Houses in 2013
- Interactive map of Gompers Houses
- Coordinates: 40.7181°N 73.9819°W
- Country: United States
- State: New York
- City: New York City
- Borough: Manhattan

Area
  - Total: 0.005 sq mi (0.013 km^{2})

Population
  - Total: 1,168
  - Density: 230,000/sq mi (90,000/km^{2})
- ZIP codes: 10002
- Area codes: 212, 332, 646, and 917
- Website: my.nycha.info/DevPortal/

Samuel Gompers Houses, also known as Gompers Houses, is a public housing development built and maintained by the New York City Housing Authority (NYCHA) on the Lower East Side of Manhattan on Pitt Street between Delancey and Stanton Streets. Gompers Houses is composed of two 20-story buildings with 474 apartments that house approximately 1,116 people. It is built on a 3.7 acres (15,000 m^{2}) site bordered by Stanton Street to the north, Columbia Street to the east, Delancey Street to the south, and Pitt Street to the west.

== History ==
The development is named after Samuel Gompers (1850–1924), an Englishman who immigrated to the United States in 1863, where he was a cigar maker, labor unionist, and workers' rights activist, who founded an organization that would eventually become the American Federation of Labor. In his early life, Gompers lived three blocks from the site.

NYCHA broke ground for the development in 1961 and the project was completed on April 30, 1964. The development was designed by Lama, Proskauer, & Prober. The relatively high cost of land for the Gompers Houses development, $13 per square foot, forced the New York City Housing Authority to build twenty story towers rather than the preferred six story buildings. As with many of the housing projects built on the Lower East Side in the 1950s and 1960s, Gompers Houses is built in the "tower in the park" style.

By the mid-1970s, the development and the Lower East Side were becoming increasingly dangerous, so much so that in 1974 Mayor Abraham Beame had a publicized walking tour to persuade residents the area was safe from crime.

Minerva Montez is the Resident Association President for Gompers Houses.

The development is currently consolidated with Rafael Hernandez Houses, Lower East Side I Infill, Seward Park Extension, and Max Meltzer Tower. However, in late 2022 to 2023, some reports have come out that Hernandez Houses, Seward Park Extension, and Max Meltzer Tower are in the process of being turned over to private companies to manage these properties in a Public-private partnership with NYCHA in order to obtain the capital funding to revitalize and modernize these properties in which they will be switched over to the RAD PACT Section 8 management. Since Gompers Houses is still under complete control of NYCHA with no official plans to be converted into the RAD PACT Section 8 program, more than likely Gompers Houses will no longer have any management oversight of Hernandez Houses, Seward Park Extension, and Max Meltzer Tower once they are converted into the new RAD PACT Section 8 management.

== See also ==
- New York City Housing Authority
