= Lower East Side I Infill =

Public housing development in Manhattan, New York

- NYCHA property
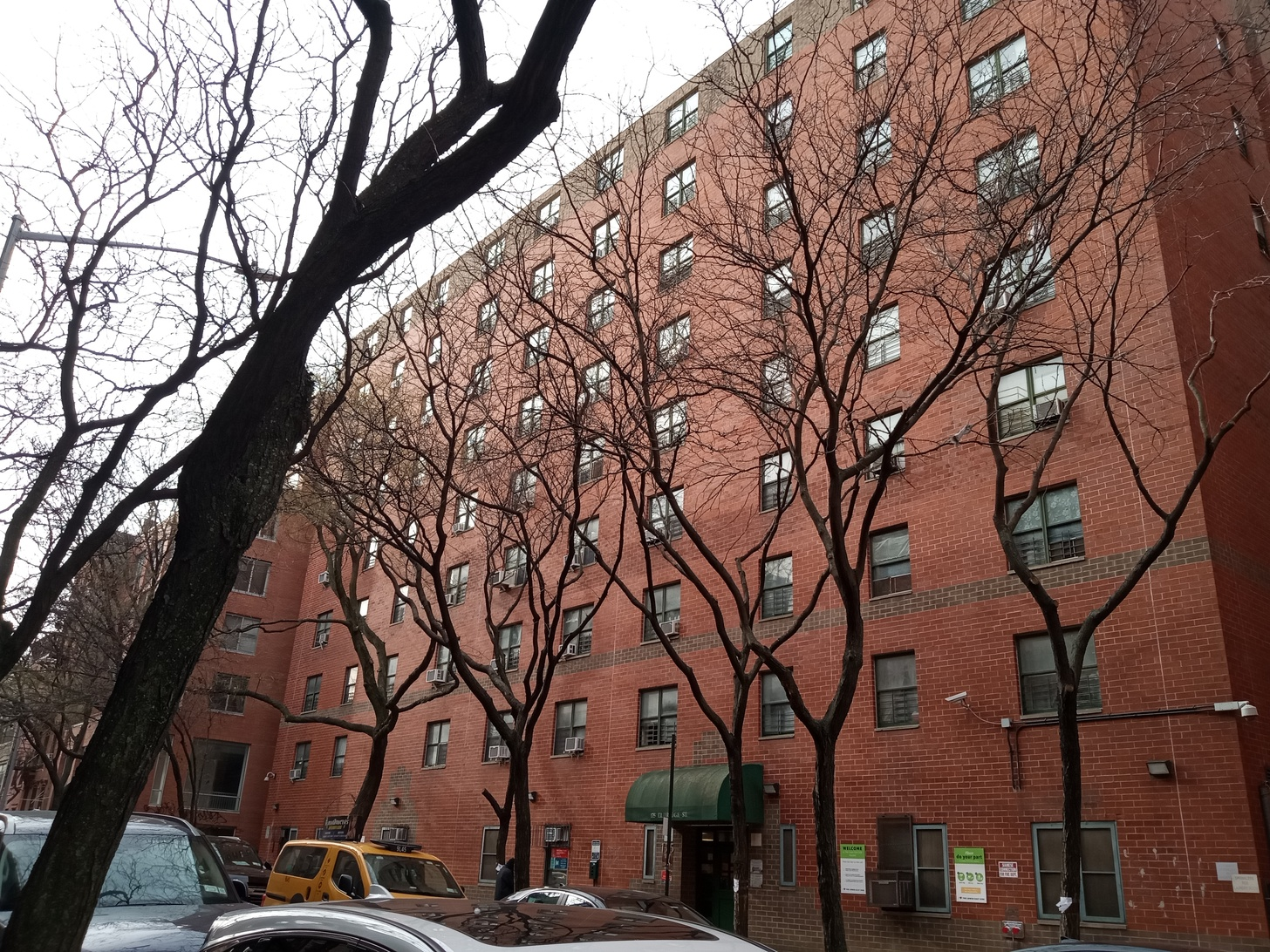
- Interactive map of Lower East Side I Infill
- Coordinates: 40.72009°N 73.99113°W
- Country: United States
- State: New York
- City: New York City
- Borough: Manhattan

Area
  - Total: 0.003 sq mi (0.0078 km^{2})

Population
  - Total: 365
  - Density: 120,000/sq mi (47,000/km^{2})
- ZIP codes: 10002
- Area codes: 212, 332, 646, and 917
- Website: my.nycha.info/DevPortal/

Lower East Side I Infill (as known as Lower East Side Infill #1) is a public housing development built and maintained by the New York City Housing Authority on the Lower East Side of Manhattan.

== Development ==
The development has five buildings, which occupy a non-continuous area of 1.98 acres (8,000 m^{2}). One nine-story building is on the west side of Eldridge Street between Delancey Street and Rivington Street. A second building is on the west side of Eldridge Street between Rivington Street and Stanton Street, while another is on the east. Both of those buildings are four-story. A fourth is on Stanton between Eldridge Street and Forsyth Street, and a fifth is on Stanton Street between Allen Street and Eldridge Street. Both of those buildings are four-story as well. These buildings have 198 apartments, which house approximately 426 people. Of those apartments, 72 are going to be reserved for elderly people.

This housing project was completed April 30, 1988.

Along with Rafael Hernandez Houses and Max Meltzer Tower, the development is consolidated with Gompers Houses, which is also on the Lower East Side.

Jacqueline Goodman is currently serving as the Resident Association President for Lower East Side I Infill. Goodman is a member of the Manhattan South District Citywide Council of Presidents.

This public housing development is serviced by the fifth precinct of the New York City Police Department, the majority of which is Chinatown, and is governed by Manhattan Community Board 3, which governs the Lower East Side, the East Village, Chinatown, and nearby communities.

== See also ==
- New York City Housing Authority
