= Hernandez Houses =

Public housing development in Manhattan, New York

Rafael Hernandez Houses
- NYCHA property
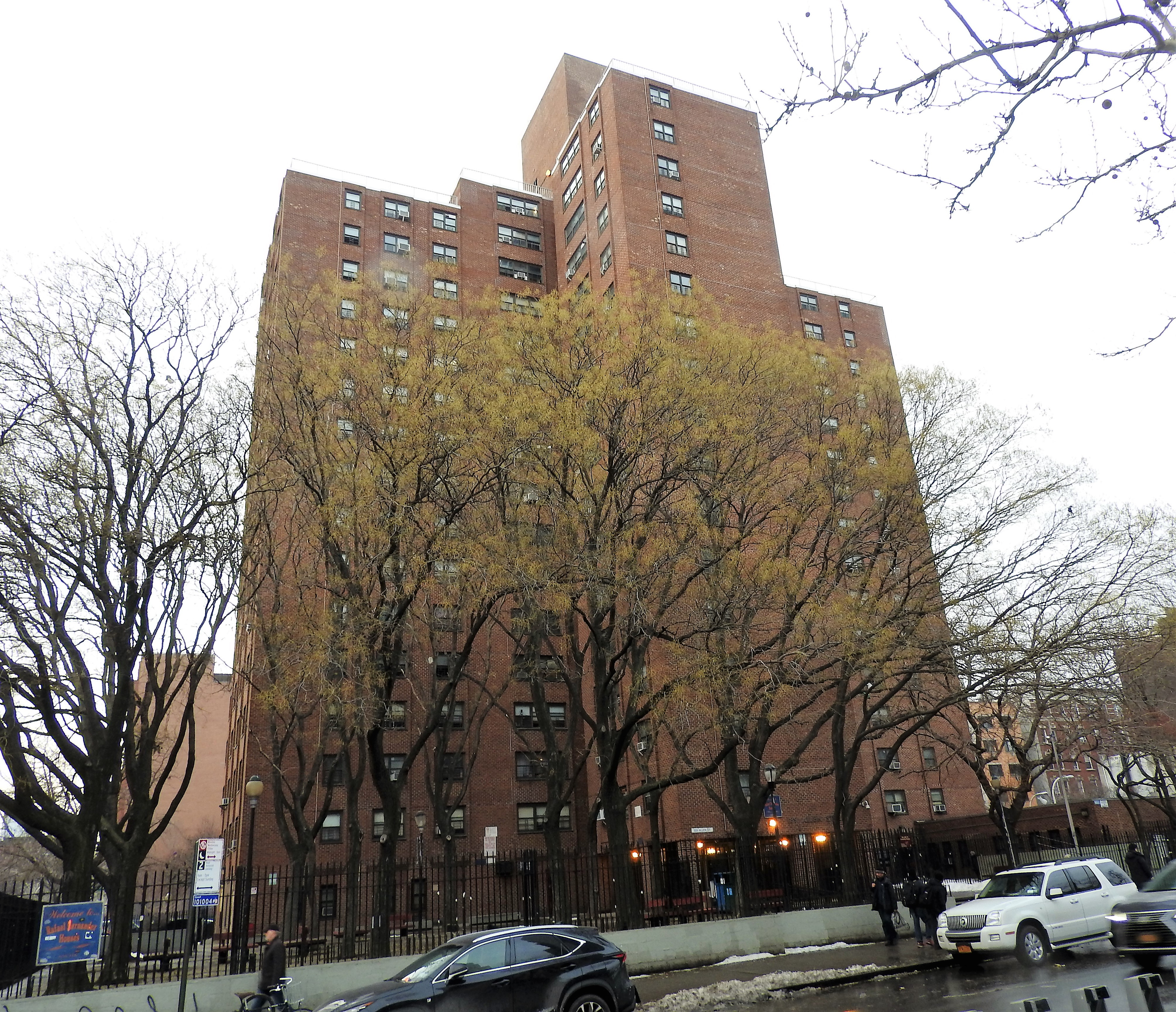
- Interactive map of Rafael Hernandez Houses
- Coordinates: 40.7221°N 73.9895°W
- Country: United States
- State: New York
- City: New York City
- Borough: Manhattan

Area
  - Total: 0.001 sq mi (0.0026 km^{2})

Population
  - Total: 269
  - Density: 270,000/sq mi (100,000/km^{2})
- ZIP codes: 10002
- Area codes: 212, 332, 646, and 917
- Website: my.nycha.info/DevPortal/

Rafael Hernandez Houses, also known as Hernandez Houses, is a public housing development built and maintained by the New York City Housing Authority (NYCHA) on the Lower East Side of Manhattan.

== Development ==
The development is a single 17-story building located on a 1.03 acres (4,200 m^{2}) site. Rafael Hernandez Houses' address is 189 Allen Street. The block containing this site is bordered to the north by East Houston Street, to the east by Allen Street, to the south by Stanton Street, and to the west by Eldridge Street. In addition to Allen Street, the building borders Stanton Street and Eldridge Street. Rafael Hernandez Houses has 149 apartments, which house approximately 280 people. The development is named after Rafael Hernández Marín (1892-1965), a Puerto Rican music composer who served in the United States Armed Forces during World War I.

Rafael Hernandez Houses was completed August 31, 1971. The architects who designed the development are Morris Ketchum Jr. & Associates.

Rafael Hernandez Houses is managed by Gompers Houses, which is also consolidated with Lower East Side I Infill and Max Meltzer Tower. As of 2015, Felicia Gordon is serving as the Resident Association President for Rafael Hernandez Houses.

== See also ==
- New York City Housing Authority
- List of New York City Housing Authority properties
