= Lower East Side Preparatory High School =

Public school in New York City

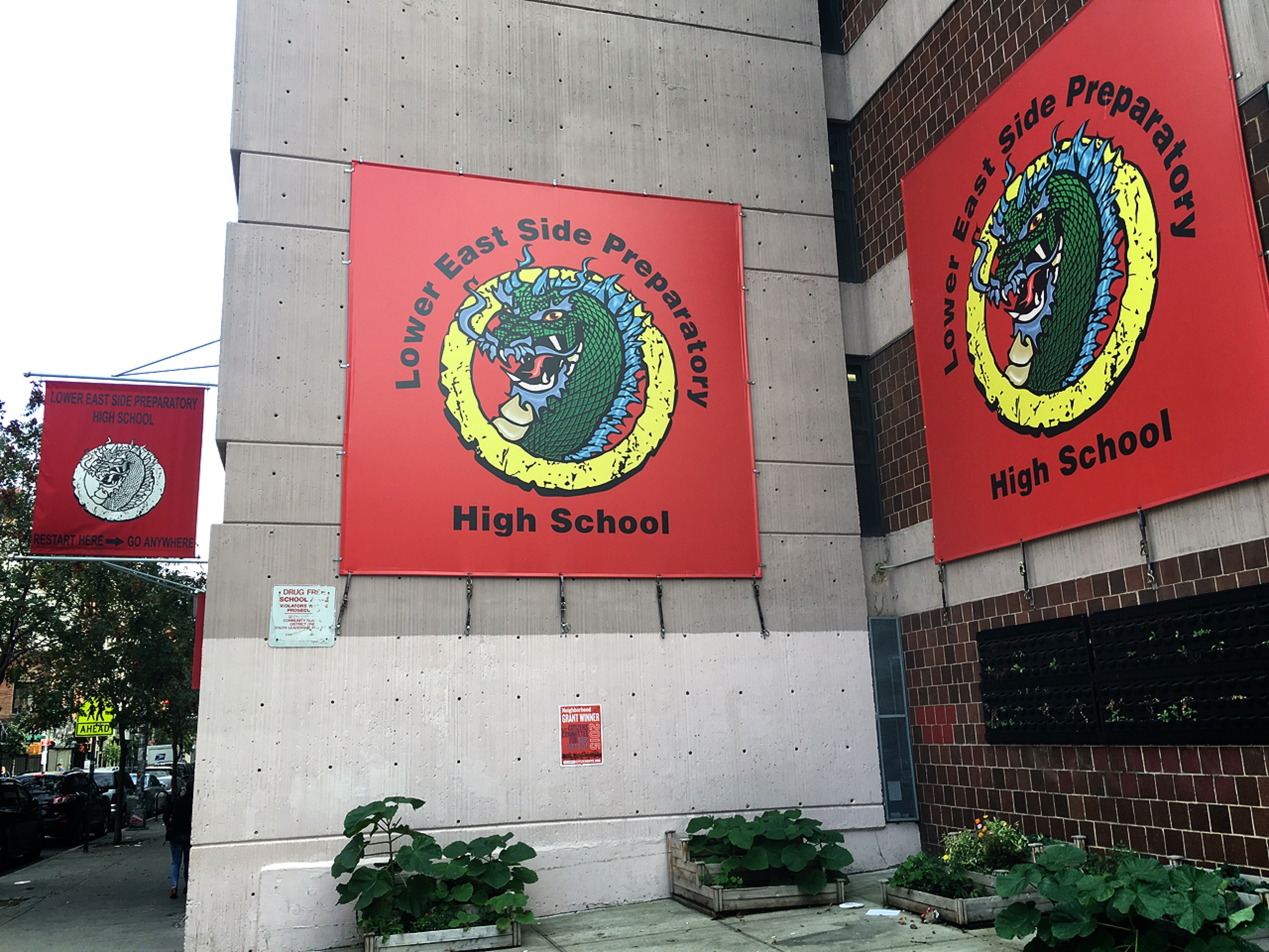
- Lower East Side Preparatory High School Front Entrance.

Location
- 145 Stanton Street, Manhattan, New York City, New York; United States; 40.7202°N 73.9860°W

Information
- Type: Public school
- Established: 1973
- Authority: New York City Board of Education
- NCES School ID: 360007600624
- Faculty: 37.7 FTEs
- Grades: 9, 10, 11, and 12
- Age range: 14 to 21
- Enrollment: 438 (as of 2022–23)
- Student to teacher ratio: 11.6:1
- Website: Official website

The Lower East Side Preparatory High School is an American public school serving students of grades 9, 10, 11, and 12 between the ages of 14 and 21. It is located at 145 Stanton Street, on the Lower East Side of Manhattan in New York City, New York.

As of the 2022–23 school year, the school had an enrollment of 438 students and 37.7 classroom teachers (on an FTE basis), for a student–teacher ratio of 11.6:1. There were 290 students (66.2% of enrollment) eligible for free lunch and 1 (0.2% of students) eligible for reduced-cost lunch.

== History and operations ==
The school originated from Manhattan's Chinatown neighborhood in 1973.

Its first students were mainly Chinese immigrants. After merging into the New York City Board of Education, the school became a transfer school, with services roved students from five boroughs of the New York City and from other countries.

Around eighty percent of its students attend college after graduation. It offers Bilingual Spanish/Chinese classes, ENL programs, as well as multiple Advanced Placement classes, extended day, preparatory for the Regents Examinations and robotics programs. The school's mission is to prepare students for college studies and their future careers.

== See also ==
- List of high schools in New York City
