= Housing Supply Action Plan =

Government plan in Canada and the US

The Housing Supply Action Plan refers mostly to a government-wide plan of the Presidency of Joe Biden to resolve housing costs. In addition, the term has been used by the Ontario ministry of Doug Ford since 2019 to address the housing shortage in the province.

Much of both plans was crafted in response to both the 2021–2023 global supply chain crisis and the 2021–2023 inflation surge, both of which arose out of the COVID-19 pandemic in the United States and Canada, which affected both construction, the distribution of construction materials and financing of construction of housing, as well as earlier outstanding costs of housing in both countries dating into the 20th century.

== By country ==
=== United States ===
President Joe Biden first announced the Housing Supply Action Plan on May 16, 2022, which the administration described as an "all of government" initiative. Among the features of the plan were the following:

- Rewarding jurisdictions that have reformed zoning and land-use policies with higher scores in certain federal grant processes at scale;
- Deploying new financing mechanisms to build and preserve more housing where financing gaps currently exist;
- Expanding and improving existing forms of federal financing, including for affordable multifamily development and preservation;
- Ensuring that more government-owned supply of homes and other housing goes to owners who will live in them instead of large investors;
- Working with the private sector to address supply chain challenges and improve building techniques.

As of August 17, 2024 the following actions were taken by various federal agencies in response to the plan:

- Federal Housing Finance Agency had approved policies and pilots to reduce closing costs for homeowners, including a pilot to waive the requirement for lender's title insurance on certain refinances
- the Consumer Financial Protection Bureau would pursue rulemaking and guidance to address anticompetitive closing costs imposed by lenders on homebuyers and homeowners.
- the Department of Housing and Urban Development (HUD):
  - announced a Pathways to Removing Obstacles to Housing (PRO Housing) program to provide $85 million in $10 million grants to jurisdictions which have acute housing shortages and are working to address barriers to housing production and preservation;
  - updated its guidelines to increase the dollar amount threshold at which a multifamily loan for FHA-insured mortgages is considered a large loan and is subject to additional underwriting requirements from $75 million to $120 million;
  - allowed larger loans to participate in the agency's Low Income Housing Tax Credit (LIHTC) Pilot Program;
  - allowed public housing authorities (PHAs) to more easily use housing vouchers and mixed-finance transactions to create or preserve housing;
  - published new guidance for public housing authorities and multifamily housing owners participating in the Rental Assistance Demonstration;
  - launched a Legacy Challenge to encourage communities which directly receive Community Development Block Grants from HUD to leverage low-cost, low-interest loans for housing investments
  - announced funding for research into commercial-to-residential conversions for a potential guide for state and local governments.
- the Department of Transportation:
  - announced its Reconnecting Communities and Neighborhoods program to provide up to $3.16 billion for planning and capital construction projects that prioritize disadvantaged communities and improve access to daily destinations, including a $450 million Regional Partnership Challenge to incentivize regional partnerships;
  - released new guidance to streamline and clarify requirements for closing DOT loans for residential development near transit, including commercial-to-residential conversions;
- the Economic Development Administration (EDA) updated its “Investment Priorities” that guide the agency's grantmaking to include an emphasis on efficient land use and density;
- the Environmental Protection Agency (EPA) announced its $27 billion Greenhouse Gas Reduction Fund (GGRF) to mobilize capital for retrofits of existing homes and buildings, construction of zero emissions buildings, and commercial to residential conversions, among others.
- the Advisory Council on Historic Preservation proposed a method which would exempt several maintenance activities from review under Section 106 of the National Historic Preservation Act for historic preservation of millions of federally-funded, licensed or owned housing units nationwide.

==== Reception ====
Despite the breadth of and critical praise for the initiative, as well as the administration's claim that the largest number of homes since 2006 were built under the plan, critics pushed against the administration for not leading enough on bipartisan negotiations with Congress, and not working hard enough with the private sector to bring down housing costs.

=== Canada ===
A similarly named plan was used by the cabinet of Doug Ford for the Ontario government's housing supply plan.
