= Seward Park Extension =

Public housing development in Manhattan, New York

- NYCHA Property
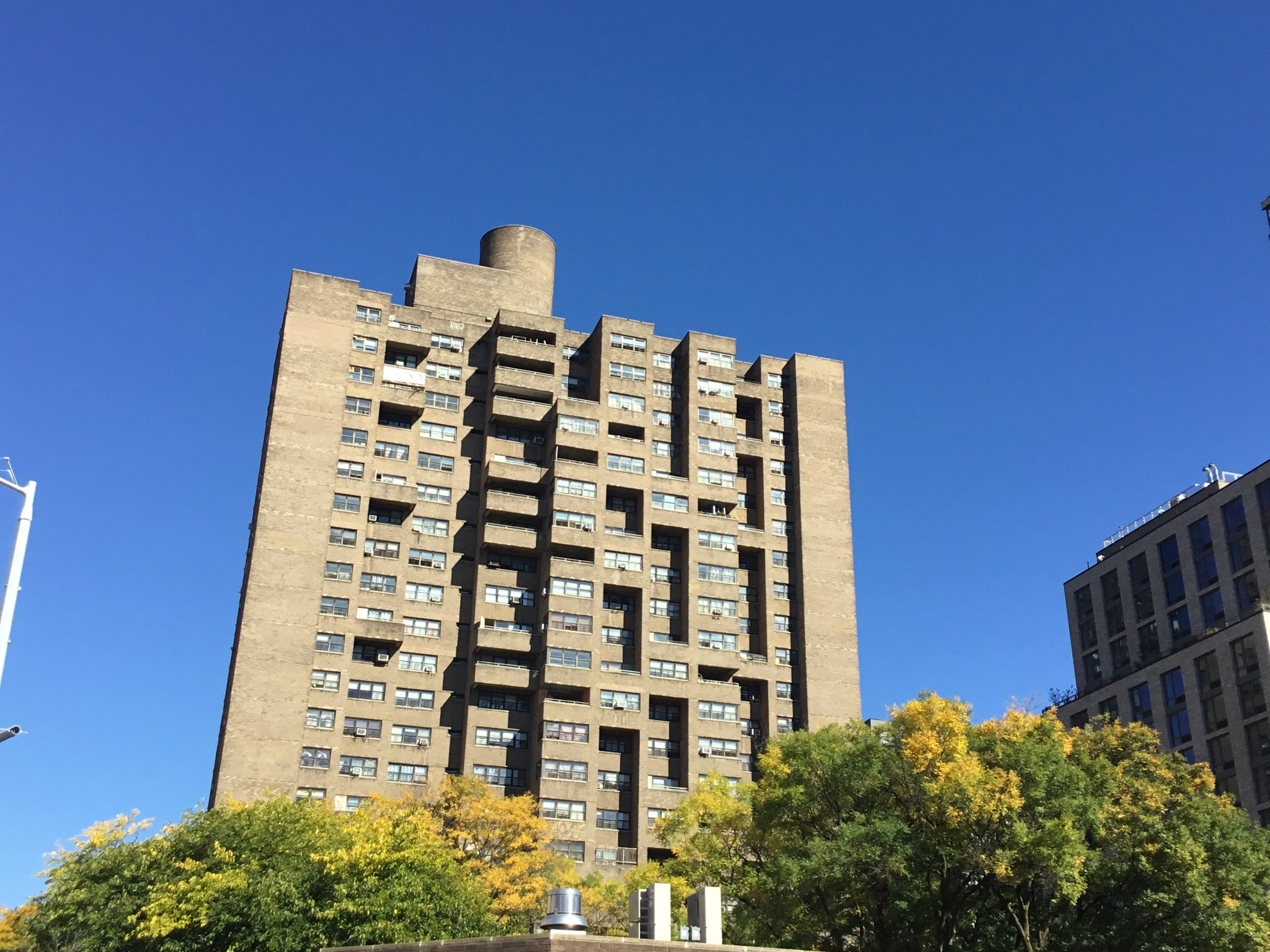
- Interactive map of Seward Park Extension
- Country: United States
- State: New York
- City: New York City
- Borough: Manhattan

Area
  - Total: 2.2 acres (0.89 ha)

Population
  - Total: 686
- Zip Code: 10002

The Seward Park Extension is a NYCHA housing project with two buildings on the Lower East Side of Manhattan. Both buildings have 23 stories; Building I is located on a block between Broome and Grand Streets and also between Essex and Norfolk Streets and Building II is located on a block between the Williamsburg Bridge in Delancey Street and Broome Street. This housing project was completed in October 1973. The opening was delayed for two years by a legal dispute over the selection of tenants.

The 2015 film The Wolfpack is a documentary about the children of the Angulo family, who were largely confined to their apartment in the housing complex and homeschooled by their mother.

== 21st century ==
In 2023-24, some reports have come out that this housing project is in the process of enrolling into Permanent Affordability Commitment Together (PACT) program, this would include apartment and building's appearance renovations, roof replacement, and its community space renovation too, etc. Once this development converts to the PACT program, it will be under the Section 8 RAD Program becoming a Project Based Voucher Development in which it will be a Public-private partnership between private companies and NYCHA where the private companies will manage the housing development with NYCHA remaining as the owner and implementing oversight and policies. MDG, Essence Development, and Wavecrest Management were selected to be PACT partners with NYCHA to manage this development. The reason for the planned conversion is to receive higher government funding as well as funding from the private companies to upkeep the maintenance and make necessary repairs.

As of November 5th, 2026, the housing development has now officially converted into this program with the listed management companies being the partners. Catholic Charities Community Services, Archdiocese of New York is a listed social service provider on site.

== See also ==
- New York City Housing Authority
