= Jules Gregory =

20th century : architect and planner

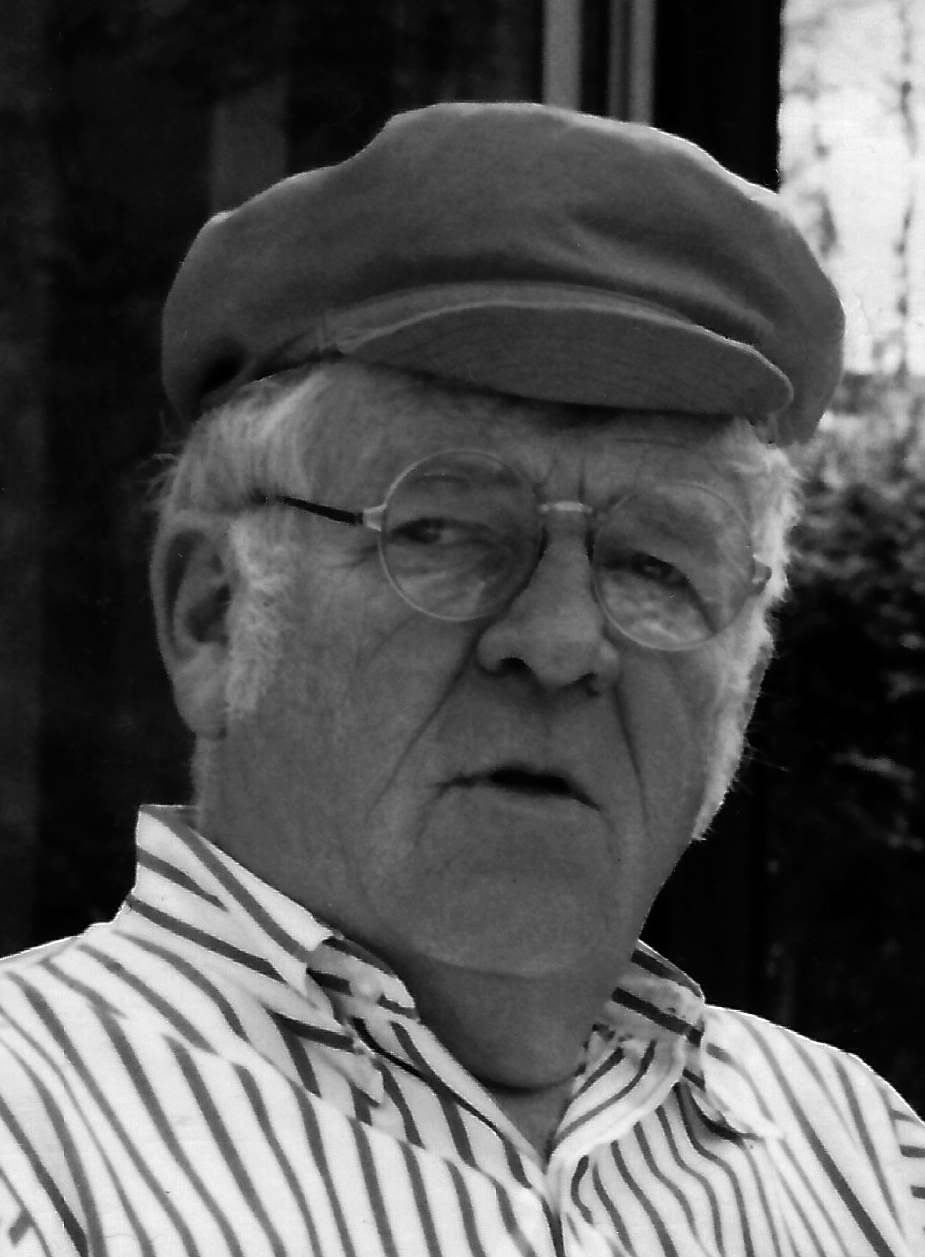
- Born: August 3, 1920; New York City
- Died: March 13, 1985 (aged 64)
- Occupation: Architect

Jules Gregory (August 3, 1920 – March 13, 1985) was an American architect and urban planner who worked in Princeton, New Jersey for most of his career.

== Early life ==
Jules Gregory was born in New York City on August 3, 1920, one of two sons of Julius Gregory, a New York architect and Mary Lovrien Price Gregory, a painter, muralist, and cartoonist. His grandfather, Eugene J. Gregory was mayor of Sacramento from 1880–1881, and his great-grandfather emigrated from France, settling in northern California in 1850 for the Gold Rush.

Jules Gregory graduated from Phillips Andover Academy in 1938, and from Cornell University College of Architecture in 1943. During World War II he worked in construction in Alaska. With a Fulbright scholarship, Gregory studied architecture at the École de Beaux Arts school in Paris from 1949 to 1950. He married Nancy Shippen Bangert Eyerly of Pleasantville, New Yorkin 1945. The couple lived in Greenwich Village in New York City. In 1950 Gregory and his wife moved to Lambertville, New Jersey, where he partnered with Alan Blauth in the firm Gregory+Blauth, Architects. Gregory and his wife had two daughters, Kathe Gregory and Nicole Gregory.

== Architecture ==
As a young architect, Gregory worked in five New York City offices: Harrison & Abramovitz; Ketchum, Giná & Sharp; Sanders & Malsin; Skidmore, Owings & Merrill; and the United Nations design team. During this time, he won two awards in a “Hidden Talent” in architecture competition, organized by The Museum of Modern Art and Architectural Record.

Gregory's first designs as an independent architect were private homes with a dramatic modernist style. He designed award-winning houses throughout New Jersey, Pennsylvania and New York. Owners included Jerome and Mrs. Chodorov, Herbert R. Axelrod, Frederic and Amelia Ramsey, Dr. David and Edith Rose, David, and Naomi Savage, Lee, and Mrs. Mendelson, Elizabeth and William Goryl, John E. Gombos, Edith, and Yosh Kawano and Donald Palese. Signature elements of these homes are soaring open, multi-level spaces framed by bent natural wood, white textured stucco, and walls of glass that let in sunlight and provided an intimate closeness with nature. His own home, built on a 10-acre wooded site outside of Lambertville, New Jersey in 1960, was featured in The American Home, winter 1963 edition, Architectural Record 1961, House and Gardens Building Guide, 1963, and more recently in The New York Times. Gregory's home featured a curved roof supported by one-foot-thick laminated wooden beams and high glass walls. Jules Gregory served as Director of the New Jersey chapter of the American Institute of Architects (AIA) from 1966 to 1968, Chairman for Commission on the Environment 1967–68, Vice President from 1968–69 and became an AIA Fellow in 1969. He was affiliated with numerous organizations including the Architectural League of New York, the New Jersey Society of Architects, and the National Institute for Architectural Education. He was co-editor along with David Lewis of Process: Architecture, Community Design: By the People, December 1977 edition, which featured stories of citizen participation in urban design.

== Urban Planning ==
In the late 1960s, Gregory became involved in urban planning initiatives through the American Institute of Architects. He coordinated the Regional Urban Design Assistance Team (R/UDAT). This was a constantly changing group of architects, urban planners, and engineers who traveled to more than 90 cities around the country. These R/UDAT teams created master plans and provided guidance to mayors and government officials on how to revitalize downtrodden areas and expand development based on the interests and needs of communities and local businesses.

In 1983 Gregory received the Edward C. Kemper Award, the highest honor of achievement from the American Institute of Architecture for his work with the R/UDAT program and his service to the architectural profession.

== Teaching ==
Gregory mentored young architects throughout his life. An obituary that appeared in Progressive Architecture magazine noted that “Jules seldom lectured, he taught in architectural schools as a visitor,” including Columbia University, Princeton University, Pratt Institute, Rutgers University, Yale University, Ohio State University, and New Jersey Institute of Technology.

== Legacy ==
The revived interest in the mid-century style created a new market for homes designed by Gregory. Gregory's community-driven urban design philosophy was posthumously acknowledged by an AIA Institute Presidential Citation, which stated that his “vision of ‘architects in service of society’ is now embedded in the AIA mission. More importantly, professionals around the world have answered his call to service by transforming their own communities through democratic design processes. His leadership legacy has had a singular impact on this field of work.”

His obituary in Progressive Architecture magazine stated, “Here was an architect who had the courage to be a humanist in increased business and technological world, one who maintained—long before urban design was even a phrase in our vocabulary—that architectural responsibility must be broadened from individual buildings to buildings as city-making…Underlying his efforts was the belief that in every local urban situation there are reservoirs of citizen wisdom, that local people everywhere need and want the opportunity to debate the issues and establish comprehensive directions into which new buildings can fit meaningfully. He felt that no architect—indeed, no single individual—could ever grasp the intricacy of contexts alone. For Jules, the answer lay in teamwork.”

== Notable Projects ==
In addition to private homes, Gregory designed many schools and churches that garnered awards and recognition.

- Marlboro Middle School, Marlboro, New Jersey (awarded Special Jury Citation for Architectural Excellence)
- Long Branch City Hall, Long Branch, New Jersey
- William S. Hart Sr. East Orange Middle School, East Orange, New Jersey (awarded Citation from the American Association of School Administrators and Award of Merit for Outstanding Architectural Excellence in Design, New Jersey Society of Architects)
- White Plains Community Church, White Plains, New York
- Luther Memorial Evangelical Lutheran Church, New Shrewsbury, New Jersey (awarded the National Gold Medal Exhibition Award, the Architectural League of New York and the American Federation of the Arts)
- Kilmer Library, Rutgers University (awarded American Association of School Administrators and Special Jury Citation for Architectural Excellence College and University Conference and Exposition)
- The Unitarian Society, East Brunswick, NJ
