= Morris Ketchum Jr. =

American architect (1904–1984)

- Born: May 5, 1904; New York City
- Died: November 22, 1984 (aged 80); Newtown, Bucks County, Pennsylvania
- Occupation: Architect
- Practice: Morris Ketchum Jr.; Ketchum, Giná & Sharp; Ketchum & Sharp; Morris Ketchum Jr. & Associates

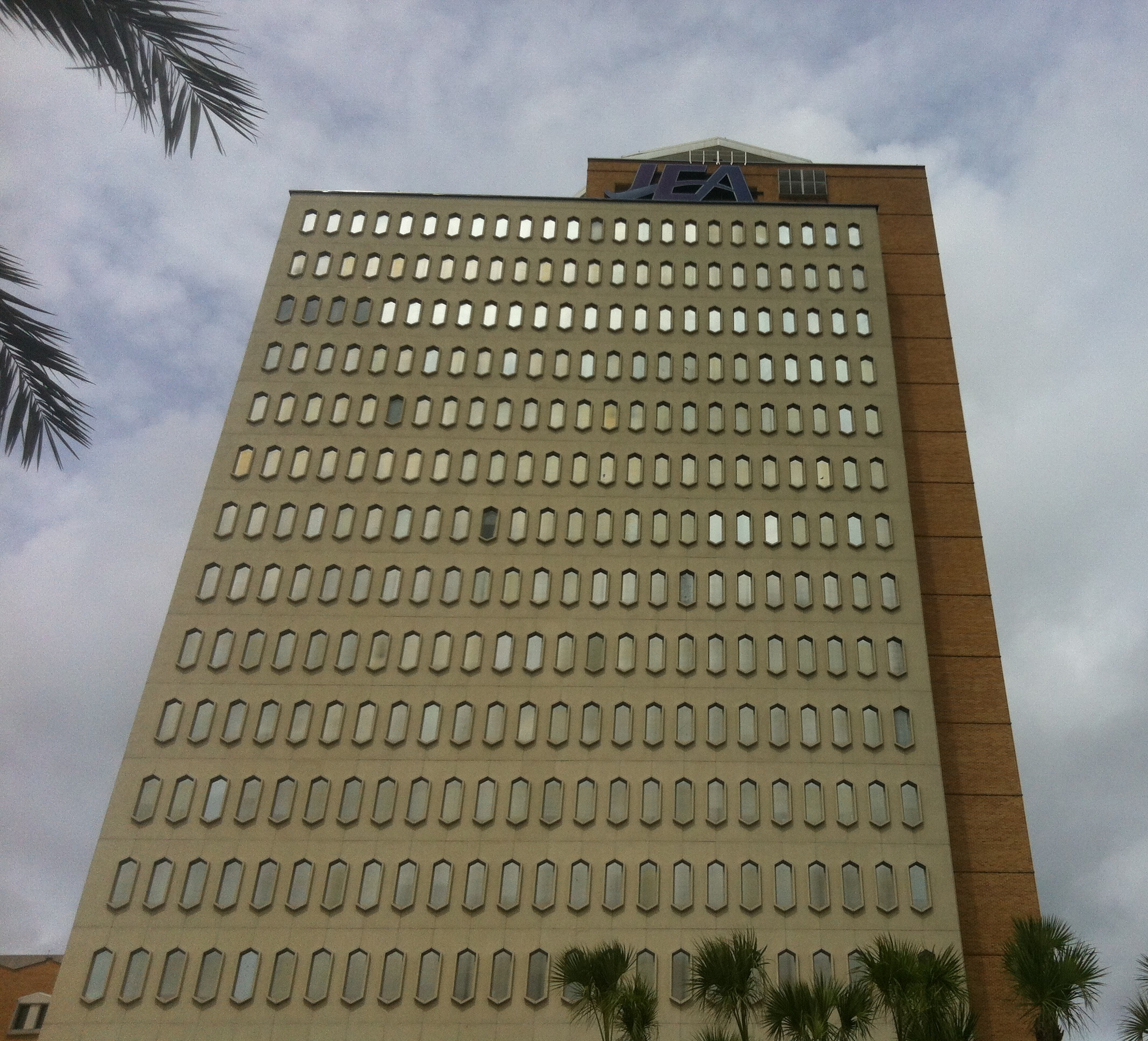
The former Universal Marion Building of Downtown Center in Jacksonville, Florida, designed by Ketchum & Sharp and completed in 1963.

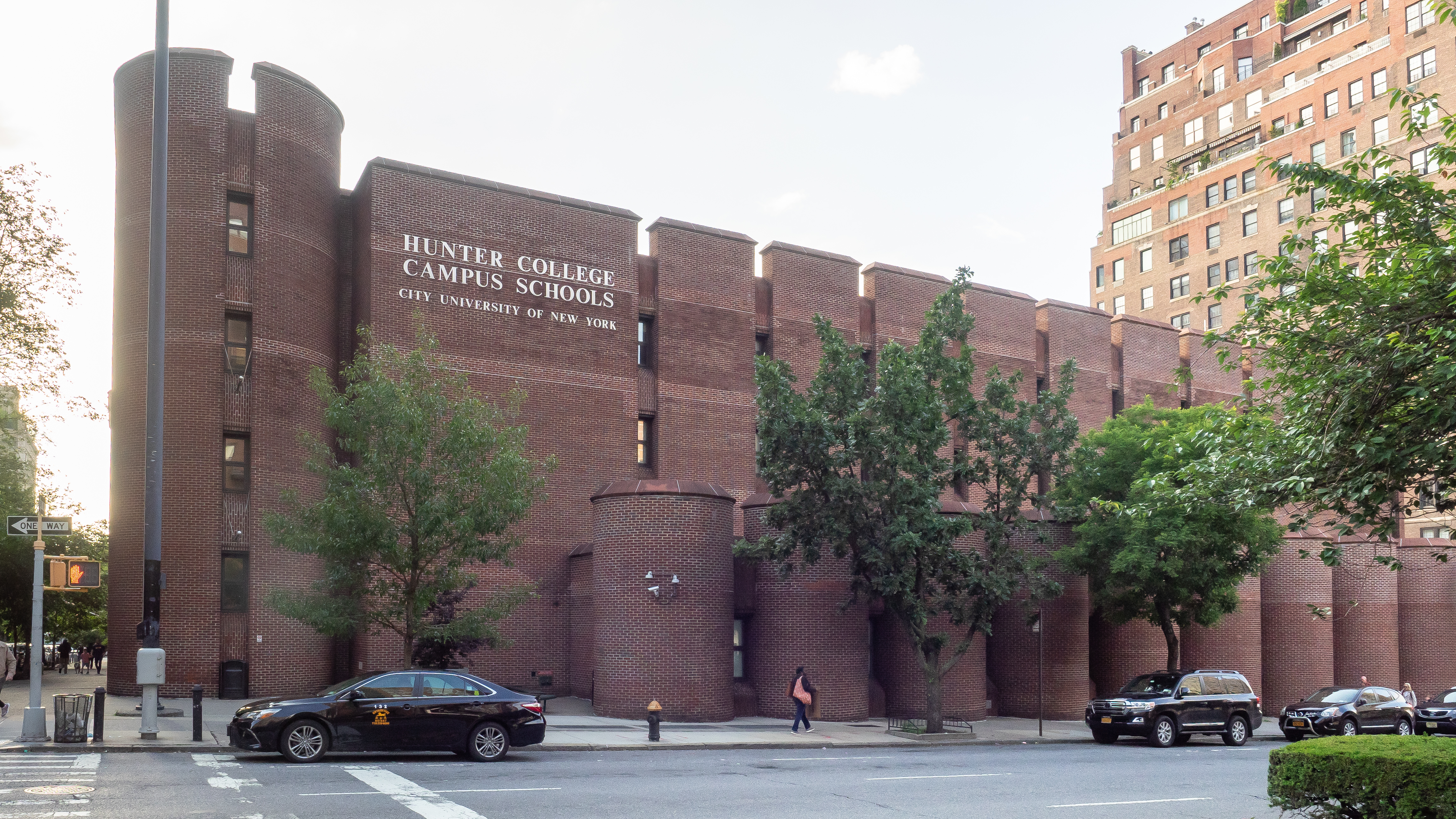
The Hunter College High School in New York City, designed by Morris Ketchum Jr. & Associates and completed in 1971.

Morris Ketchum Jr. FAIA (May 5, 1904 – November 22, 1984) was an American architect in practice in New York City from 1938 to 1980. He was president of the American Institute of Architects for the year 1965–66.

== Life and career ==
Morris Ketchum Jr. was born May 5, 1904, in New York City. He was educated at Columbia University and at Fontainebleau, graduating in 1928. After his return to the United States he worked for York & Sawyer, Francis Keally and Mayers Murray & Phillip before becoming an associate in the office of Edward Durell Stone in 1936. In 1938 he established his own practice. He was associated on some early retail projects with Victor Gruen, who was not then a licensed architect. Due to the success of these projects Ketchum offered to form a partnership with Gruen, but quickly rescinded the offer after his wife objected to him being associated with a recent immigrant. Nonetheless, the success of these early projects caused both architects to have influential careers in retail design.

Ketchum worked as a sole principal until 1944, when he formed a partnership with architects Francis X. Giná and J. Stanley Sharp in the firm of Ketchum, Giná & Sharp. Also in that year Ketchum hired Natalie de Blois, who had just graduated from Columbia. After only eight months he fired her after she discouraged a male employee's romantic advances, though he found a job for her in the New York office of Skidmore, Owings & Merrill. Major works of the partnership include Shopper's World in Framingham, Massachusetts, opened in 1951 as one of the first suburban shopping malls in the United States. Though initially known chiefly for retail design, during the 1950s Ketchum expanded his practice into other project types. Giná and Sharp left to form their own practices, in 1958 and 1961, respectively, and in 1962 Ketchum reorganized the firm as Morris Ketchum Jr. & Associates with Herbert W. Riemer as his principal associate. Ketchum retired from practice in 1980.

Ketchum joined the American Institute of Architects in 1942, and was elected a Fellow in 1953. He was chair of the jury on honor awards in 1960 and was chancellor of the College of Fellows in 1961 and 1962. He also served as New York regional director from 1961 to 1964 and as first vice president for the year 1964–65 before being elected president for the year 1965–66. From 1958 to 1960 he led the Architectural League of New York and from 1973 to 1979 was vice chair of the New York City Landmarks Preservation Commission.

Ketchum was the author of Shops and Stores, published in 1948 and reissued in 1957, and Blazing a Trail, a record of his career, published in 1982.

In addition to de Blois, notable architects who worked in the Ketchum office include Jules Gregory, Arthur Cotton Moore, John C. Portman Jr. and William Rupp.

== Personal life ==
In 1934 Ketchum was married to Isabella T. Stiger at Hewlett, New York. He died November 22, 1984, at home in Newtown, Bucks County, Pennsylvania.

== Architectural works ==
- Davison's, 864 Broad St, Augusta, Georgia (1947, altered)
- Shopper's World, 1 Worcester Rd, Framingham, Massachusetts (1950–51, demolished 1994)
- Kawneer office building, 2547 8th St, Berkeley, California (1953)
- Julia A. Traphagen Elementary School, 153 Summit Ave, Waldwick, New Jersey (1956)
- Universal-Marion Building, (Note: Planned as a combined retail and office development for a May Company subsidiary. Now the headquarters of JEA.) Church St W, Jacksonville, Florida (1960–63)
- United States Embassy (former), 2 Ave Mohamed El Fassi, Rabat, Morocco (1961)
- Dining Hall, Queens College, City University of New York, Queens (1962)
- Horace E. Green Public School 45, 84 Schaefer St, Brooklyn (1965)
- NYCHA Kingsborough Extension, 1737 Bergen St, Brooklyn (1965)
- Dining hall and dormitory complex, State University of New York at Morrisville, Morrisville, New York (1967)
- Hunter College High School, 71 E 94th St, Manhattan (1969–71)
- World of Darkness, Bronx Zoo, the Bronx (1969)
- NYCHA Hernandez Houses, 189 Allen St, Manhattan (1971)
- NYCHA Meltzer Tower, 94 East 1st St, Manhattan (1971)
- World of Birds, Bronx Zoo, the Bronx (1972)
