= Rental Assistance Demonstration =

American federal public housing program

- Type of project: Federal housing program and rental assistance
- Country: United States
- Ministry: Department of Housing and Urban Development (HUD)
- Launched: 2012
- Status: Active

Rental Assistance Demonstration is a federal housing program that was enacted as part of the Consolidated and Further Continuing Appropriations Act, 2012, and is administered by the United States Department of Housing and Urban Development (HUD). Broadly, the purpose of the Rental Assistance Demonstration (or RAD) is to provide a set of tools to address the unmet capital needs of deeply affordable, federally assisted rental housing properties in order to maintain both the viability of the properties and their long-term affordability. It also simplifies the administrative oversight of the properties by the federal government. Specifically, RAD authorizes the conversion of a property's federal funding from one form to another, where the initial form presents structural impediments to private capital investment and the new form (project-based section 8) is not only familiar to lenders and investors but, since its enactment in 1974, has leveraged billions in private investment for the development and rehabilitation of deeply affordable rental housing.

RAD has been amended by four pieces of legislation:

- Consolidated Appropriations Act, 2014
- Consolidated and Further Continuing Appropriations Act, 2015;
- Consolidated Appropriations Act, 2016. and
- Consolidated Appropriations Act, 2017.

Initially, Congress capped the number of units that could be converted under RAD at 60,000, but by October 2014 it was reported that HUD had received applications to convert more than 184,000 units. In FY2015 Congress reauthorized RAD and increased the cap to 185,000 units. An independent assessment of the program from its inception through the autumn of 2015 found that, using existing resources of $250 million, the program had leveraged approximately $2.5 billion in capital investment. In FY2017, Congress again reauthorized RAD, once again increasing the cap, this time to 225,000 units. It was raised again in FY2018 to 455,000 units.

== Project-based section 8 funding platform ==
HUD administers multiple rental assistance programs. RAD authorizes the conversion of assistance under several of these programs to project-based section 8 assistance, which may take either of two forms:

- Project-based rental assistance (PBRA) authorized under section 8 of the U.S. Housing Act of 1937 ("the Act"); or
- Project-based voucher (PBV) assistance authorized under section 8(o)(13) of the Act.

The project-based section 8 funding platform is characterized by a number of features that enable properties assisted under either the PBRA or PBV program to leverage capital investment. From an owner or developer perspective, the four most important features are:

- The availability of a long-term rental assistance contract (typically 20 years);
- The expectation that the contract will be funded fully (i.e., at levels specified in the contract), with monthly assistance amounts that are predictable, reliable, and stable over the course of the contract;
- The option to renew the contract on substantially the same terms; and
- The reduced administrative burden imposed by HUD.

Essentially, a long-term project-based section 8 contract, known as a Housing Assistance Payments (HAP) contract, is something that an owner or developer may "take to the bank" as evidence of the ability to repay borrowed funds. In addition to assuring the borrower's ability to repay, the HAP makes the properties attractive to investors in the federal Low-Income Housing Tax Credit (LIHTC) program, through which equity capital investment is made available. (A default on borrowed funds could otherwise result in recapture of the credits, harming investors.)

The HAP contract also binds the owner to rent to income-qualified (i.e., low-income) households, with the subsidy covering the difference between 30 percent of a tenant's adjusted income and a predetermined and accepted contract rent. Thus a HAP contract enables an owner to serve low-income families, without compromising a property's financial viability.

Funding of PBRA and PBV contracts is subject to annual appropriations. To date, PBRA contracts have always been fully funded, meaning that Congress has never failed to appropriate adequate funds to the PBRA account to cover contracts funded out of that account. While funding appropriated by Congress for the Housing Choice Voucher (HCV) program (out of which the PBV program is funded) fluctuates from year-to-year, PHAs have every incentive and are in fact contractually bound (by the PBV HAP) to fully fund their PBV HAP contracts, which may leave them with tough choices (e.g., issuing fewer tenant-based vouchers or finding other ways to save on overall HCV costs).

== Properties eligible for RAD conversion ==
Properties assisted under the following HUD rental assistance programs are eligible for RAD conversion:

- Public Housing;
- Section 8 Moderate Rehabilitation (including the Mod. Rehab. Single-Room Occupancy (SRO) program); and
- Rent Supplement/Rental Assistance Program.

Each of these programs is described below, with a focus on the impediments to capital investment that RAD conversion eliminates.

=== Public housing ===
Enacted in 1937, the public housing program is authorized under section 9 of the Act. Section 9 assistance is administered locally by public housing agencies (PHAs), which receive funding from HUD to support the operating and capital needs of public housing properties. As of 2010, there were 3,040 PHAs nationwide, administering a combined 7,340 public housing properties, comprising some 1,105,380 units. More than 2.2 million families are served by the program. Of these families, 32% are elderly (head of household or spouse is aged 62 or older), 21% include a family member with a disability, and 39% are households with children.

There is nothing akin to a HAP contract in the public housing program. Instead, funds flow to each PHA through an Annual Contributions Contract (ACC) between the PHA and HUD. Separate amounts for operating and capital assistance are allocated annually, by formula. The public housing program lacks all three of the key features of a project-based section 8 contract that enable owners of properties assisted with PBRA and/or PBV to leverage private capital investment:

Long-term assistance contract. The ACC is essentially a perpetual contract. Under the ACC, if a PHA accepts operating and capital fund assistance, it must use that assistance to serve low-income families.

Predictable, reliable, stable funding. The level of funding made available to PHAs from any one year to the next fluctuates based on the amount appropriated by Congress. Typically, agencies receive pro-rated operating funding (i.e., an amount less than the operating fund formula would otherwise dictate) and capital funding that is grossly inadequate to address repair needs, let alone replacement needs. In order to support their operations, PHAs have some flexibility to use capital fund monies for operating purposes. A report procured by HUD and published in June 2011 estimated that unmet capital needs across the public housing portfolio totaled nearly $26 billion.

Option to renew on same terms. The concept of "renewal" does not apply in the public housing program, given the perpetual nature of the ACC. Instead, for as long as a PHA accepts operating and capital funding each year, it remains in the public housing program and must comply with "all applicable statutes, executive orders, and regulations issued by HUD, as they shall be amended from time to time." This means that as Congress enacts new laws that affect the public housing program, or as HUD issues new regulations, a PHA must comply with those laws and regulations, irrespective of any cost associated with doing so. In some respects, the terms of the ACC contract change as frequently as new laws are enacted and/or new regulations are promulgated. (Note: This is also true for a public housing project that converts to PBV assistance under RAD. A project that converts to PBRA, however, enjoys some protections against statutory or administrative changes that occur during the term of the HAP contract, particularly if such changes could imperil a property's physical viability.)

=== Section 8: moderate rehabilitation ===
Enacted in 1978, the section 8 Moderate Rehabilitation (Mod. Rehab.) program was intended to provide project-based rental assistance at levels that would support properties needing less than a substantial level of rehabilitation. The authority for new Mod. Rehab. contracts (except for those intended to provide single-room occupancy (SRO) housing for homeless individuals) was repealed in 1990. Existing contracts are eligible for renewal under the Multifamily Assisted Housing Reform and Affordability Act of 1997 (MAHRAA), as amended, which governs the renewal of all section 8 PBRA contracts.

The Mod. Rehab. program is administered by PHAs, who enter into HAP contracts with private owners. As of 2010, there were some 22,804 units with Mod. Rehab. assistance. These units served just under 49,000 people. Of families served by the program, 24% are elderly, 34% include a family member with a disability, and 21% are families with children.

Even though the program operates through a HAP contract, HUD practices and the renewal terms dictated by Congress disfavor private capital investment in Mod. Rehab.–assisted properties:

Long-term assistance contract. For a number of reasons, HUD has adopted the practice of renewing Mod. Rehab. contracts for only one year at a time. Generally, a short-term contract is not something that an owner or developer can "take to the bank."

Predictable, reliable, stable funding. The Mod. Rehab. program was repealed due to a scandal having to do with how HUD awarded the assistance contracts. The effects of the scandal linger in the form of relatively unfavorable renewal terms, which are embedded in MAHRAA. Specifically, renewal rents must be at the lesser of current rents, as adjusted; Fair Market Rent; or market rent. This means that properties with below-market rents can renew only at similar rent levels, as adjusted by what is typically a modest amount. Since HUD does not offer multiyear contracts, the rents are re-set each year at contract renewal.

Option to renew on same terms. While the HAP may be renewed annually on substantially the same terms, the rents will fluctuate, for the reasons described above.

=== Rent Supplement/Rental Assistance Payment ===
Enacted in 1965 and 1968, respectively, the Rent Supplement (Rent Supp.) and Rental Assistance Payment (RAP) programs are both rental assistance programs governed by contracts between private owners and HUD. While both programs' funding platforms are in this way similar to the project-based section 8 HAP, neither program is a section 8 program subject to renewal under MAHRAA. In fact, neither type of program assistance contract is renewable. Fully funded at the time the programs were enacted years ago, each rental assistance contract simply runs its course, with a hard expiration date after which tenants may receive tenant-based rental assistance, but the properties themselves are no longer deeply affordable. Many Rent Supp/RAP–assisted properties — like Mod. Rehab.–assisted properties — are partially assisted; this is partly a function of the fact that the per-unit assistance levels have declined relative to operating costs over time, so more and more units have become unassisted. Conversion to the project-based section 8 platform under RAD makes it possible for owners of Rent Supp./RAP–assisted properties to move to a renewable form of contract, receive fresh capital investment in their properties, and retain deeply affordable rents for the income-eligible tenants residing in them.

As of 2010, there were some 13,723 Rent Supp/RAP–assisted units, serving 18,908 people. Of families residing in these units, 52% are elderly, 15% include a family member with a disability, and 24% are families with children.

== RAD's first and second components ==
RAD was implemented through notice. The implementation notice has been modified three times. The latest version governs the program, addressing conversions of assistance under RAD's first and second components.

First Component. RAD's first component governs the conversion of assistance under section 9 of the Act (i.e., public housing funding) to PBRA or PBV assistance. The language authorizing RAD caps public housing conversions at 225,000 units nationwide. PHAs wishing to convert under this component must go through a selection process. There is no incremental funding tied to these conversions; instead, PHAs convert their public housing funding to PBRA or PBV assistance at approximately their current funding levels.

Second Component. Under RAD's second component, owners of properties assisted under the section 8 Mod. Rehab. (including Mod. Rehab. SRO), Rent Supp., and/or RAP programs are eligible to convert to PBRA or PBV assistance. These second-component conversions are not subject to any cap, nor are the owners required to go through a competitive selection process. Instead, conversions are subject to the availability of tenant protection vouchers (TPVs). TPVs are issued at contract termination or expiration (irrespective of RAD); under RAD's second component, TPVs issued pursuant to contract terminations or expirations occurring after October 1, 2006, are eligible for conversion to PBRA or PBV assistance.

== Additional features of RAD ==
In addition to authorizing conversions of assistance, RAD features a number of other elements.

=== Choice-mobility option ===
Tenants residing in a RAD property (i.e., a property whose assistance has been converted to PBRA or PBV under RAD) have the right to a Housing Choice Voucher (HCV) after residing in the property for a certain period of time. Specifically, a tenant residing in a property with PBRA has a right to HCV assistance after two years, while a tenant residing in a PBV-assisted property has a right to such assistance after one year. To prevent a scenario in which a PHA's turnover HCVs are being largely consumed by tenants in RAD properties choosing to exercise this mobility option, RAD offers PHAs the ability to cap the number of turnover HCVs that go to tenants of RAD properties — as opposed to families on the PHA's waiting list for HCV assistance — in any one year. Similarly, to prevent high levels of turnover at individual properties, which can be destabilizing and costly, owners of properties assisted with PBRA may limit to 15 percent the number of families in any one property who may exercise mobility in any one year. For PHAs that do not administer HCV assistance and owners of properties assisted with PBRA that are not within the jurisdiction of a PHA that administers HCV assistance, RAD offers limited good-cause exemption from Choice-Mobility.

=== Annual rent adjustments ===
Once a property has converted assistance under RAD, it is subject to the annual adjustment protocol that applies to the PBRA or PBV program. Specifically, properties converted to PBRA are eligible for an annual operating cost adjustment, each year on the anniversary of the HAP contract, subject to the availability of appropriations. The adjustment is applied to the contract rent, less the portion of the rent paid for debt service. Properties converted to PBV are eligible for an adjustment, if requested by the owner, as long as rents remain reasonable (i.e., do not exceed rents for comparable, unassisted units).

=== No cost transfer of funding ===
Congress provided no funding for conversions under RAD's first component. As each public housing property goes through a "no-cost" conversion, funding is simply transferred from the section 9 account (public housing) to the respective section 8 account (PBRA or PBV). Practically, this means that initial contract rents under the new HAP are established based on pre-conversion funding levels, taking into account the rent caps that apply in the PBRA or PBV program. As part of its RAD implementation notice, HUD calculated the contract rents for each public housing project in the country; the methodology employed by HUD is explained in Attachment 1C of the implementation notice.

=== Resident rights ===
Tenants of RAD properties have a set of rights, some of which are particular to RAD, and some of which are part of the PBRA or PBV programs. The right to exercise Choice-Mobility, addressed above, is among these rights. The others are described below.

No rescreening of current households. For all intents and purposes, current tenants of properties going through RAD conversion become "new admissions" to the PBRA or PBV program as soon as the funding converts. In order to protect such tenants from being displaced, the language authorizing RAD prohibits treating them like new admissions, for example prohibiting screening (e.g., credit checks, etc.) and exempting them from income-eligibility determinations and income-targeting requirements. As soon as these tenants move from their units, however, the units may be rented only to income-qualified households who meet other admissions criteria.

Right to return/relocation assistance. For conversions to PBRA or PBV, any tenant living in a property prior to conversion has a right to remain. If the property is being significantly rehabilitated as part of the conversion, then the tenant has the right to return following any temporary relocation. The Uniform Relocation Act applies to any relocation that results from acquisition, new construction, or rehabilitation.

Phase-in of rent increases. If a tenant's monthly rent will increase above a certain amount solely as a result of conversion, then the rent increase must be phased in over a period of up to 5 years. The PHA has the discretion to determine the phase-in period.

Continued Family Self-Sufficiency (FSS) and Resident Opportunities and Self Sufficiency Service Coordinators (ROSS-SC) program participation. The FSS and ROSS-SC programs provide incentives, services, and service coordination to families to help them make progress toward achieving self-sufficiency or to enable them to age in place. Not all PHAs participate in these grant programs. In the event a public housing tenant participates in one of these programs and the conversion of assistance results in that family's housing assistance being administered by a PHA that does not participate in the program, the family retains the right to continue their participation until program completion (in the case of FSS) or until the grant funds have been expended (in the case of ROSS-SC).

Resident participation and funding. Tenants residing in properties converted to PBRA or PBV assistance under RAD have the right to establish and operate a resident organization "for the purpose of addressing issues related to their living environment." The resident organization is eligible for resident participation funding.

Resident procedural rights. Residents of public housing properties converted to PBRA or PBV assistance obtain certain procedural rights pertaining to grievance procedures and notification of termination.

Earned income disregard. The earned income disregard (EID) is a feature of several HUD programs that is intended to encourage work and continued employment by disregarding, for a period of time, any increase in earned income that would, in the absence of the EID, increase a tenant's rental payment. Under RAD, if a tenant is participating in the EID and the conversion of assistance would make them ineligible for the benefit, they may continue to receive the benefit for the duration of their eligibility.

Jobs Plus. Jobs Plus is a pilot program that provides grant funding and targeted flexibilities to PHAs so that they may implement strategies to help public housing residents increase their employment and earnings. Under RAD, public housing properties owned by Jobs Plus grantees that are converted to PBRA or PBV assistance may continue to participate in the Jobs Plus program until the grant has been closed out.

Over-income households. In some cases, a conversion of public housing to PBRA or PBV assistance may result in a situation where the tenant's rental payment exceeds the unit rent. Typically, when a tenant's rental payment exceeds the unit rent, the tenant becomes unassisted, and the unit in which they reside is removed from the HAP contract. Since a key purpose of RAD is to leverage private capital investment, the removal of a unit from the HAP contract would be counterproductive. For RAD conversions, therefore, such tenants simply pay the unit rent, and the units remain under the HAP contract. The tenant also continues to be considered a "program participant," which means they retain the Choice-Mobility, procedural, and all other rights that pertain to program participants.

Under-occupied units. A public housing family residing in a unit that has more bedrooms than required, based on the family size, may remain in that unit following conversion to PBRA or PBV assistance but must move to an appropriate-sized unit when one on that site becomes available.

Renewal of lease. Owners of PBV-assisted properties are required to renew all leases upon expiration, unless cause for nonrenewal exists.

Establishment of waiting list. A PHA may have separate waiting lists for its public housing and HCV/PBV programs, or it may have a combined waiting list. Likewise, a multifamily owner may have one waiting list for each property assisted with PBRA, or it may operate a community-wide waiting list. RAD specifies how households on the waiting list of a public housing property that goes through a conversion to PBRA or PBV assistance are to be notified about the conversion of assistance and informed about how to apply for the new waiting list.

=== Public input ===
In establishing the eligibility and selection criteria for properties applying to participate in RAD, as well as the procedures for selecting such properties, the HUD Secretary is required to provide an opportunity for public comment. The Secretary is also required to assure that residents of public housing properties proposed for conversion to PBRA or PBV assistance under RAD have an opportunity to comment. Both of these requirements are embedded in the language authorizing RAD. In order to implement the latter requirement, HUD stated, in the implementation notice, that RAD conversion will be considered a "significant amendment" to a PHA's Annual Plan or Five-Year Plan, triggering a mandatory public consultation process. Outside of RAD, PHAs generally have the latitude to determine which changes or amendments to their Plan(s) constitute a significant amendment.

=== Waivers and alternative requirements ===
The language authorizing RAD gives the Secretary the ability to waive or specify alternative requirements for any provision of the PBV statute, as well as "any provision that governs the use of assistance from which a property is converted under the demonstration or funds made available for [the public housing and PBRA programs]". In order to implement such waivers and alternative requirements, the Secretary is required to make a determination that they are necessary and, 10 days prior to making such waivers or alternative requirements effective, to publish a notice in the Federal Register specifying what they are.

Section 1.5 of the implementation notice lists the waivers and alternative requirements that have been adopted pursuant to this authority.

=== Continued ownership of properties converted from public housing ===
The language authorizing RAD requires continued public ownership or control of public housing properties. Specifically, it requires that a public or not-for-profit entity maintain ownership or control of a public housing property that converts to PBRA or PBV assistance. Transfer to a private entity following conversion is permitted only pursuant to foreclosure, bankruptcy, or termination and transfer of assistance for material violations or substantial default, and then only if no public entity is capable of assuming ownership. Transfer of ownership to a for-profit entity is permitted only to facilitate access to Low Income Housing Tax Credits, and then only if the PHA retains an interest in the property.

In addition, the public housing Declaration of Trust that is released as assistance is converted from section 9 to section 8 is replaced by a long-term, renewable use and affordability covenant.

Finally, upon expiration of each PBRA or PBV contract attached to a former public housing property, the Secretary is required to offer a renewal contract, and the owner is required to accept such offer.

=== Conversion of tenant protection vouchers to project-based assistance ===
The language authorizing RAD required the Comptroller General of the United States to study the long-term effect of the conversion of fiscal year 2012 and 2013 tenant-protection vouchers (TPVs) to project-based vouchers (PBVs). The purpose of the study was to assess whether, over the long term, conversions of tenant-based assistance to project-based assistance would be likely to affect the housing choices available to assisted residents. Specifically, the Comptroller General was asked to examine the change in the ratio of TPVs to PBVs.

The report was published on April 24, 2014.

=== Requirement to assess and publish findings ===
Finally, HUD is required under the language authorizing RAD to "assess and publish findings regarding the impact of the conversion [of public housing] on:

- the preservation and improvement of the former public housing units,
- the amount of private capital leveraged as a result of such conversion, and
- the effect of such conversion on residents."

A September 30, 2014, progress report on RAD summarized program results through August 2014 and described the timing and content of the larger independent evaluation required by Congress.

On September 21, 2016, HUD published an "Evaluation of HUD's Rental Assistance Demonstration, Interim Report." This independent assessment of the program completed the first phase of the congressionally mandated evaluation. The findings from that report are summarized below. A second study, forthcoming, will "conduct physical assessments at a sample of RAD and non-RAD properties, analyze financial reports for RAD and non-RAD properties, examine administrative data on the location of RAD residents, and survey a sample of RAD residents to understand how the program affected them."

== Highlights from interim report ==
The Evaluation of HUD's Rental Assistance Demonstration (RAD) — Interim Report is an independent assessment of the program's performance from its inception through the autumn of 2015. Overall findings from the report are summarized below:

- Applications received: 1,078 (from 423 PHAs)
- Completed conversions: 185 projects, totaling 19,255 units
- Financing: $2.5 billion leveraged, using existing resources of $250 million, for a leverage ratio of 9:1

With respect to the size of PHAs participating in RAD, 8 percent are small, 29 percent are medium, and 48 percent are large. The report explores in detail why PHAs chose to participate in RAD, how they selected projects to be converted, and why they chose to convert to either the PBRA or PBV platform. Several PHAs submitted multiple applications, seeking to convert as much of their inventory as possible to the section 8 platform.

Not all projects that underwent conversion did simultaneous rehabilitation. For example, 18 percent of projects that converted did so to begin to establish a capital reserve for future repairs, made possible by moving to the section 8 funding platform. Of the 63 percent of projects that did undergo rehabilitation (19 percent had such severe capital needs that they are being demolished and rebuilt), construction costs per unit averaged just under $61,000.

== RAD as proof of concept ==
With respect to public housing, issues with the program became evident within a few decades of its enactment. By 1948 — a mere 11 years after the program had been authorized — a special subcommittee in the Senate that had been appointed to develop housing legislation decided against adopting "controversial" proposals for additional public housing. Ultimately, the Housing Act of 1949 authorized 810,000 additional public housing units, but it wasn't until 1969 that this production goal was met. In the meantime, programs that provided subsidy to private entities to develop and operate deeply affordable rental housing had been enacted. Federal Housing Policy & Programs: Past and Present, published in 1985, provides a thorough discussion of this time period and the dynamics that factored into both the negative realities and the negative perceptions of the public housing program.

By 1980, Raymond J. Struyk, of the Urban Institute, published a book suggesting that the public housing funding system be changed to "the type of formula used to provide subsidy payments in the Section 8 program." This suggestion was among several precursors to the enactment of RAD. For example, the bipartisan, congressionally mandated Millennial Housing Commission issued a report in 2002 calling, among other things, for a gradual transition of the public housing program to a project-based (i.e., section 8) approach.

RAD has not been without its detractors. On October 7, 2015, U.S. Congresswoman Maxine Waters (D–CA) raised a number of concerns about the program and asked for a Congressional review.

== Recent developments ==
The figures below come from the January 2018 issue of RAD Talk, which is published by HUD:

- From the program's start through December 2017, PHAs and their partners have leveraged more than $5 billion for the construction and rehabilitation of 818 public housing projects, totaling 88,039 public housing units.
- This investment has led to the creation of approximately 94,700 jobs.
- It would have taken 47 years for PHAs to complete this work using only federally appropriated funds.
- Twenty-seven percent of the entire public housing stock has been converted under RAD (57 percent to PBV assistance and 43 percent to PBRA).
- With respect to Rent Supplement/Rental Assistance Payment contracts, 200 properties comprising more than 25,000 units have been preserved; only 24 properties from these legacy programs remain.
- More than 2,500 former Moderate Rehabilitation and Mod Rehab SRO units have been preserved via RAD; an additional 31,500 units are in the RAD pipeline.

During 2017, HUD published improved relocation guidance and took additional measures to ensure that construction work is completed as required, residents are returned to the properties, and owners comply with federally mandated hiring requirements.
