= Stanton Street =

Street in Manhattan, New York

Coordinates: 40°43′14.95″N 73°59′11.66″W

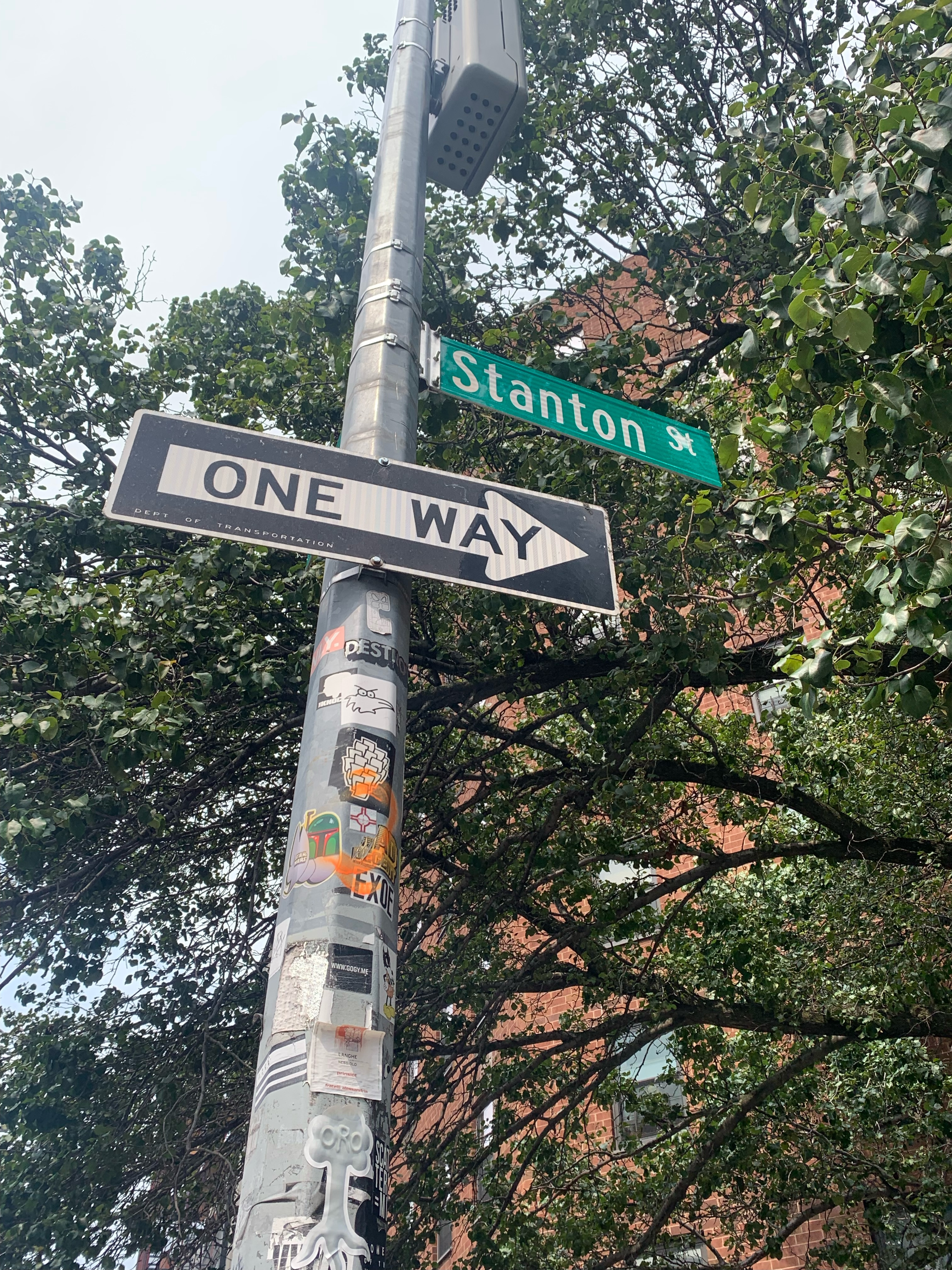
- Stanton Street Sign in Manhattan
- Interactive map of Stanton Street
- Location: New York City (Manhattan)

Stanton Street is a west-to-east street in the New York City borough of Manhattan, in the neighborhood of the Lower East Side. The street begins at the Bowery in the west and runs east to a dead end past Pitt Street, adjacent to Hamilton Fish Park. A shorter section of Stanton Street also exists east of Columbia Street; it was isolated from the remainder of the street in 1959 with the construction of the Gompers Houses and the Masaryk Towers.

Stanton Street largely carries a bike lane, a through lane, and a parking lane. It runs one block north of Rivington Street and one block south of Houston Street. The street is named after George Stanton, an associate of landowner James De Lancey.

== Community ==
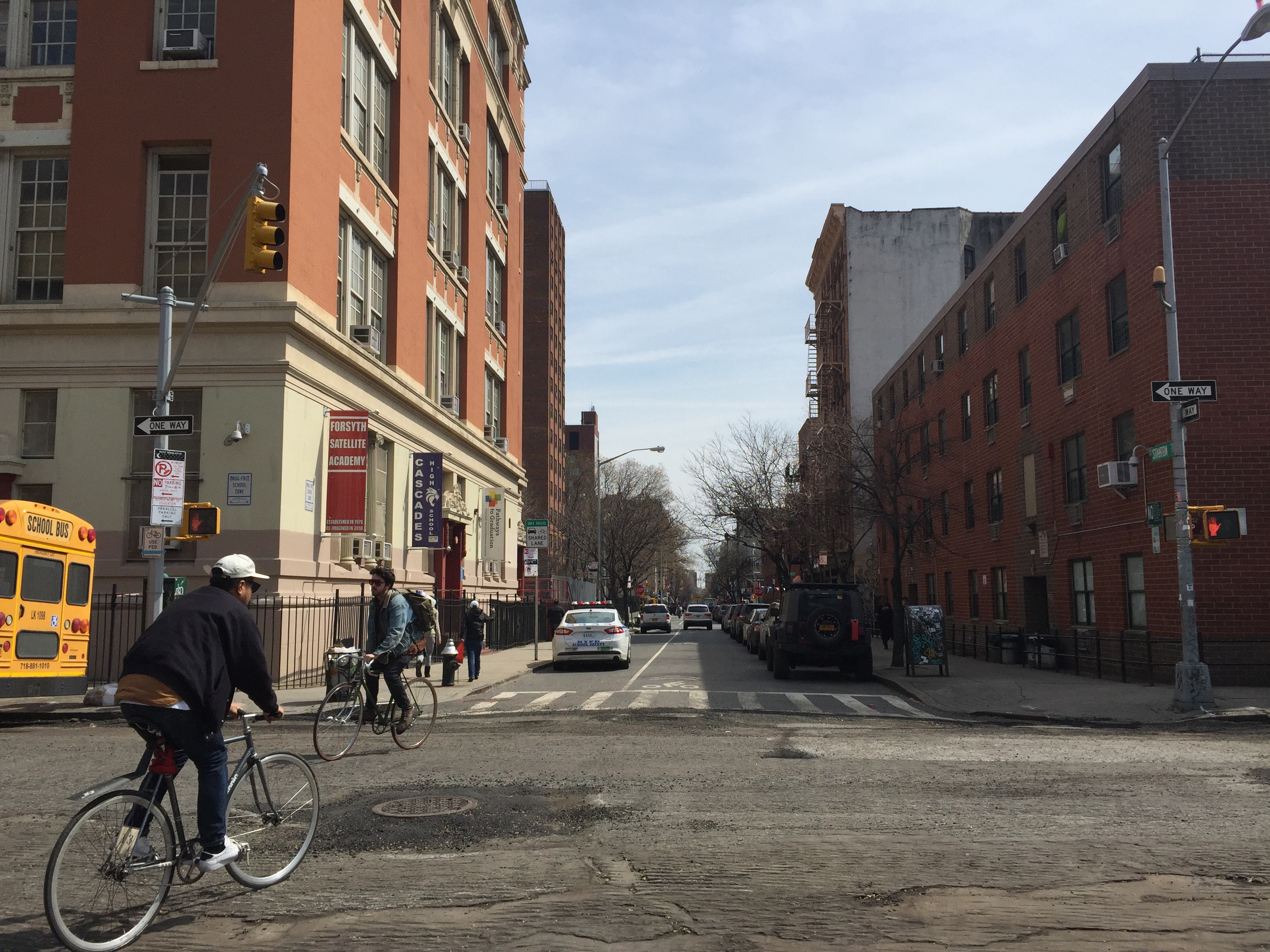

The street also includes a settlement house based on the ideas that Jane Addams brought from the settlement movement in England that won her a Nobel Prize in 1931. The Stanton Street Settlement, founded in 1999, is active in the community through volunteer work.

The site of the second African burial ground in New York lies between Stanton and Rivington Streets, now a playground in the Sara Delano Roosevelt Park. The M'Finda Kalunga community garden is also at this location.

The Lower East Side, once known for its large Jewish community of German, Eastern European Jews and later by Puerto Ricans before an influx of newer immigrants, is beginning to see a slight resurgence in the Jewish character of the neighborhood, led by the Stanton Street Synagogue, Congregation Bnai Jacob Anshei Brzezan.

The Sara D. Roosevelt Park had a service facility at Stanton Street which included a public restroom until 1994, when it was closed.

== Notable residents ==
Lady Gaga lived there before she was famous.

== In popular culture ==
Forever protagonist Henry Morgan and his adopted son lived at Suffolk & Stanton Streets (the actual Louis Zuflacht building at 154 Stanton Street, which for the show was "Abe's Antiques").

The street, crowded, with market goods, is shown in the first popular sound movie "The Jazz singer" (1927).
