= Meltzer Tower =

Public housing development in Manhattan, New York

Meltzer Tower Meltzer Houses
- NYCHA Property
- Meltzer Towers
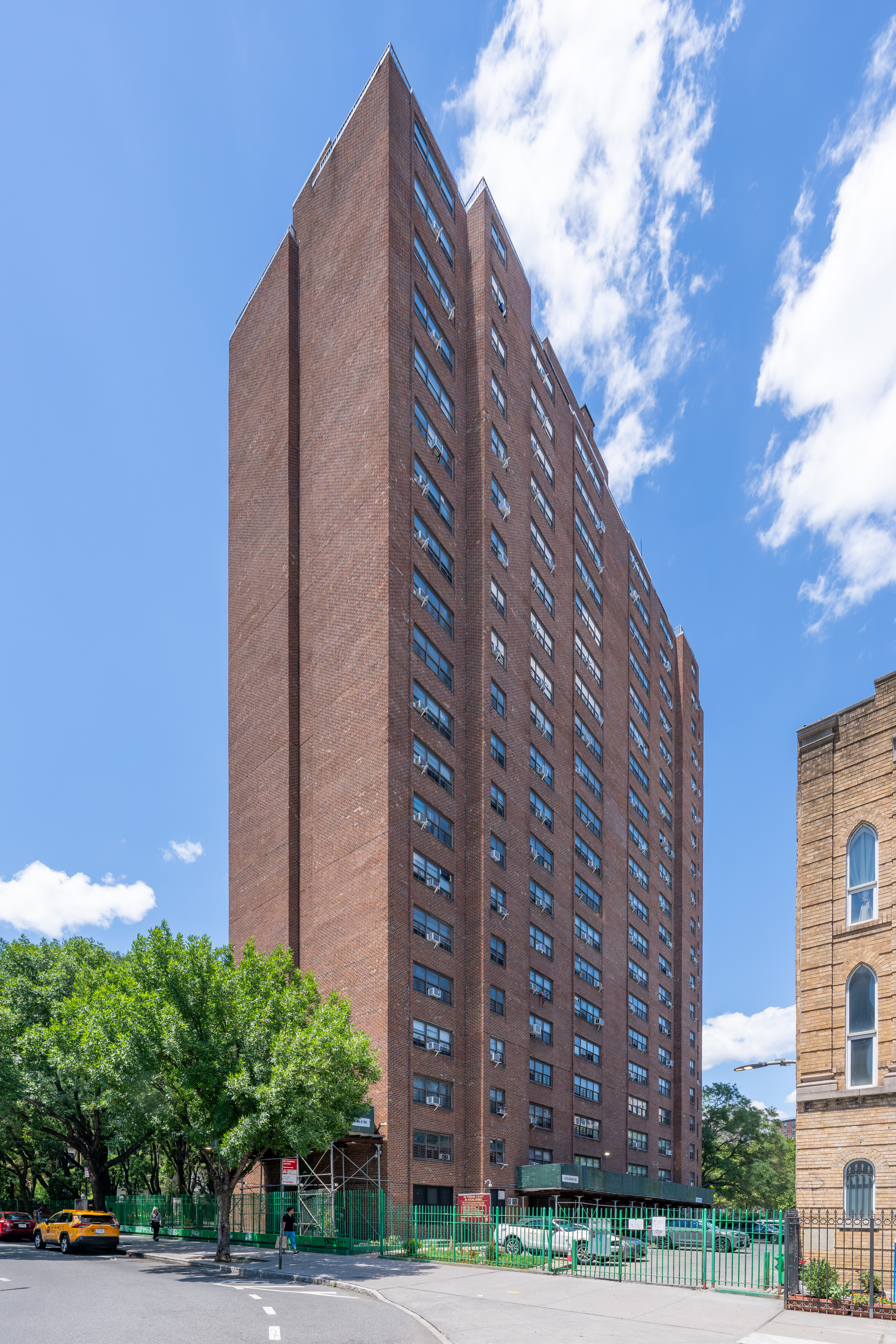
- Interactive map of Meltzer Tower
- Country: United States
- State: New York
- City: New York City
- Borough: Manhattan

Area
  - Total: 1.19 acres (0.48 ha)

Population
  - Total: 211
- ZIP Code: 10009

The Meltzer Tower (also known as Meltzer Towers) is a NYCHA housing building with 20 stories. It is located between East 1st and 2nd Streets and also between 1st Avenue and Avenue A in the East Village neighborhood of Manhattan in New York City.

== History ==
This building was completed in August 1971, designed by the architecture firm of Morris Ketchum & Associates, and is exclusively used as senior citizen housing. The building was named after Max Meltzer (1908–1962), a lawyer and a community leader from the Lower East Side.

=== 21st century ===
In 2013, the city proposed leasing the landscaped seating area adjacent to the building to a private developer, which would be used to construct a new building containing 97 apartments.

In 2022, the tower was selected for the Permanent Affordability Commitment Together (PACT) program for $23,000,000 in repairs and renovations for apartments, roofs, window and elevator replacements, lobby, landscaping, water systems, heaters, stairs, and more.

== See also ==
- New York City Housing Authority
