= Grand Street (Manhattan) =

Street in Manhattan, New York

Grand Street is a street in Lower Manhattan, New York City. It runs west/east parallel to and south of Delancey Street, from SoHo through Chinatown, Little Italy, the Bowery, and the Lower East Side. The street's western terminus is Varick Street, and on the east it ends at the service road for the FDR Drive.

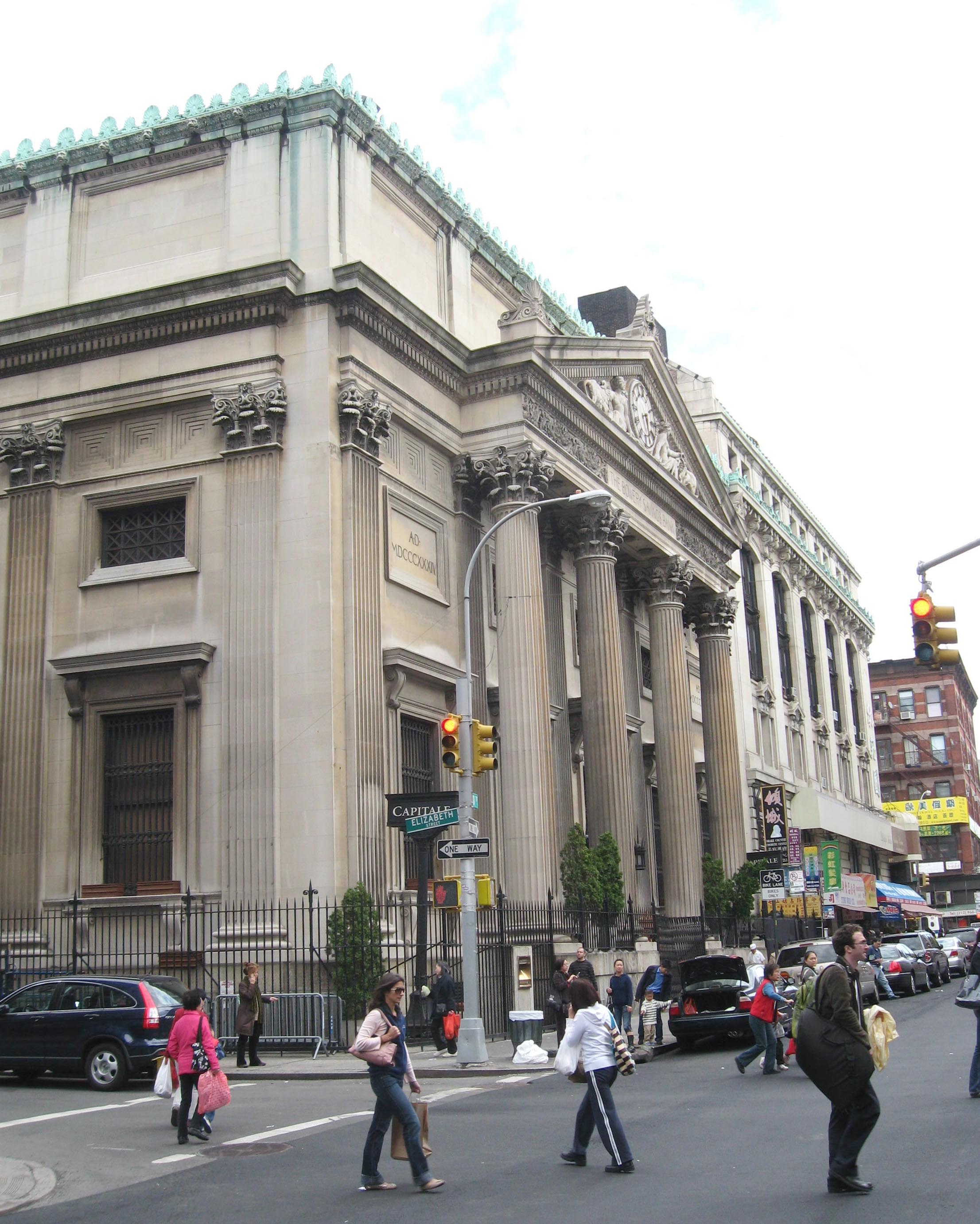
Bowery Savings Bank Building (130 Bowery)

== History and description ==
Grand Street was once part of the lands of James De Lancey Jr. When his sister Ann married Judge Thomas Jones he gave them a two-acre estate known as "Mount Pitt", near the site of present-day Pitt and Grand Streets. It was one of the highest natural points on Manhattan island. In early 1776, a circular redoubt was built there, where General Joseph Spencer established a battery. The British captured the defenses the following November and renamed it Jones Hill Fort. The hill was later leveled and some of the field stone used for the construction of St. Augustine's Church on Henry Street.

Bayard Mount at the site of present-day Grand and Mott Streets was the tallest hill in lower Manhattan, and overlooked the Collect Pond. In April 1776, the Bayard's Hill redoubt, (also known as Fort Bunker Hill) was constructed as part of the defenses across Manhattan Island. After the war, this became a popular site for dueling. In 1802 work began on leveling Mount Bayard.

St. Mary's Catholic Church is located at 438-440 Grand Street between Pitt and Attorney Streets. The parish was established in 1826 to serve Irish immigrants living in the neighborhood, it is the third-oldest Catholic parish in New York. The church itself was built in 1832–33, and its facade replaced in 1871 by the noted architect Patrick Charles Keely. The original portion is the second-oldest Roman Catholic structure in the city, after St. Patrick's Old Cathedral, which was built in 1815.

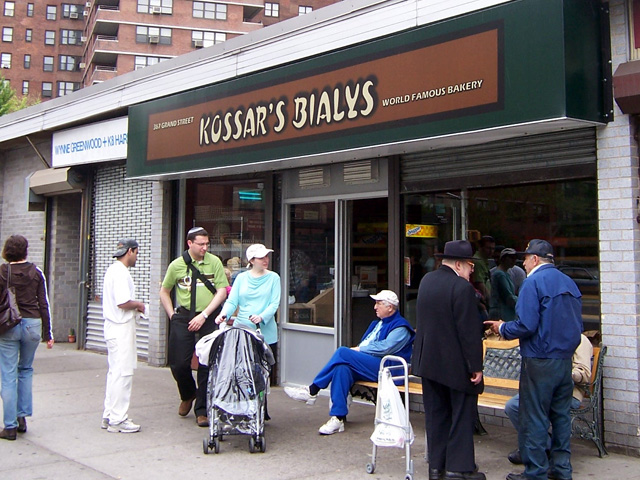
Kossar's Bialys

Ferrara Bakery and Cafe was established at 195 Grand Street in 1892.

The Bowery Savings Bank building at 130 Bowery, extending to Grand and Elizabeth Streets, was designed by Stanford White of the architecture firm of McKim, Mead & White, and built in 1893–95. It is a New York City designated landmark and on the National Register of Historic Places.

The bialy bakery Kossar's Bialys was founded in 1936.

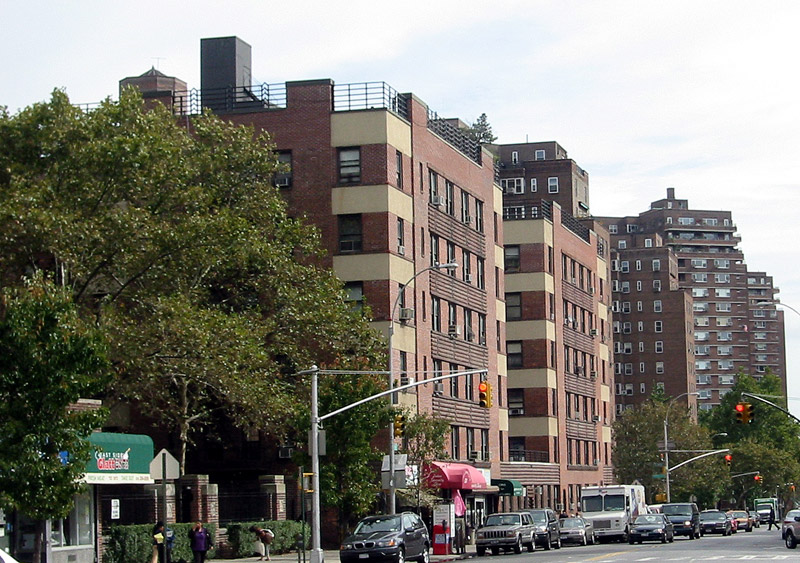
Cooperative Village at the eastern end of Grand Street. Amalgamated Dwellings in foreground, one of the oldest housing cooperatives in the United States. East Side Glatt is also shown

Cooperative Village, a collection of housing cooperatives, covers several blocks near the eastern portion of Grand Street. Other notable buildings include the old Police Headquarters Building, the Home Savings of America building, and the Bialystoker Synagogue.

As part of an experiment, in 1948, Grand Street west of Chrystie Street was converted to a one-way eastbound street. Grand Street is one-way to motor vehicles west of Chrystie Street and two-way to its east. Grand Street is the location of an on-street bikeway which, west of Chrystie street, is between a lane of parked vehicles and the curb, and east of Chrystie Street, is indicated by shared lane markings of various types.

== Transportation ==
In the 19th century, before the construction of the Williamsburg Bridge, the Grand Street Ferry connected Grand Street to its counterpart in Brooklyn.

The New York City Subway's Grand Street station, serving the B and D trains, is at the intersection of Grand and Chrystie Streets.

The following bus routes serve Grand Street, all of which terminate at its eastern end:

- The M14A SBS serves it east of Essex Street, with westbound service beginning at Jackson Street.
- The westbound M21 runs from the FDR Drive to Lewis Street.
- The eastbound M22 runs east of Madison Street.

In addition, downtown M1 buses that run the full route serve Grand Street in the eastbound direction from Broadway to Centre Street, where it terminates.

== See also ==
- Forty-second Street and Grand Street Ferry Railroad
