= Ferrara Bakery and Cafe =

Coordinates: 40.71904°N 73.99702°W

Ferrara Bakery & Cafe
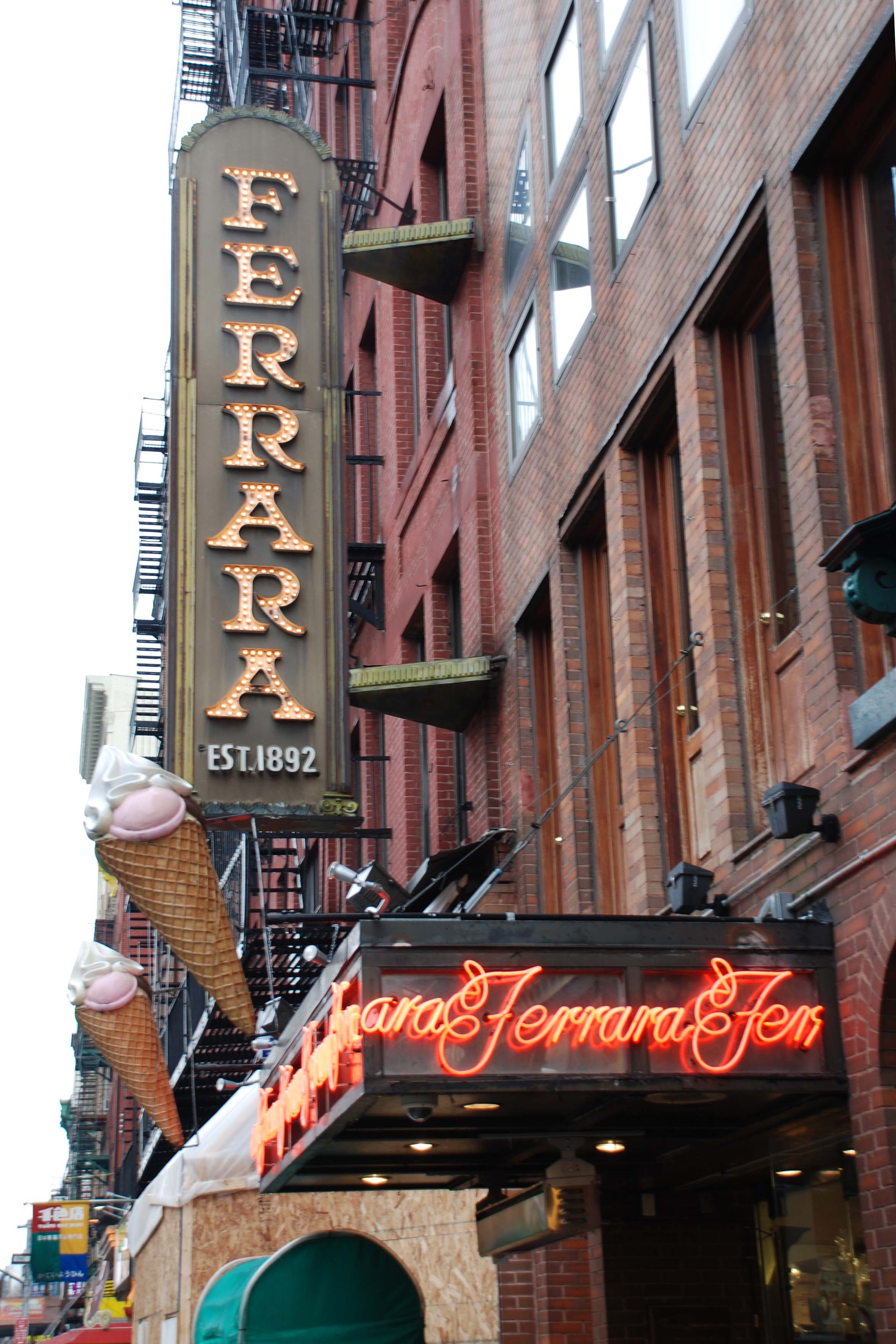
- Front of Ferrara Bakery and Cafe
- Interactive map of Ferrara Bakery & Cafe

Restaurant information
- Established: 1892; 134 years ago
- Food type: Italian bakery
- Location: 195 Grand Street (between Mulberry Street and Mott Street), New York City, United States
- Website: Official website

Ferrara Bakery and Cafe, established in 1892 by Antonio Ferrara, claims to be America's first espresso bar. It is located in Little Italy, Manhattan, New York City, and offers Italian delicacies. Ferrara has remained a family owned business since its inception, and is operated at its original location on Grand Street by the family's fifth generation of bakers.

== See also ==
- List of Italian restaurants
