= Lower East Side =

- Neighborhood
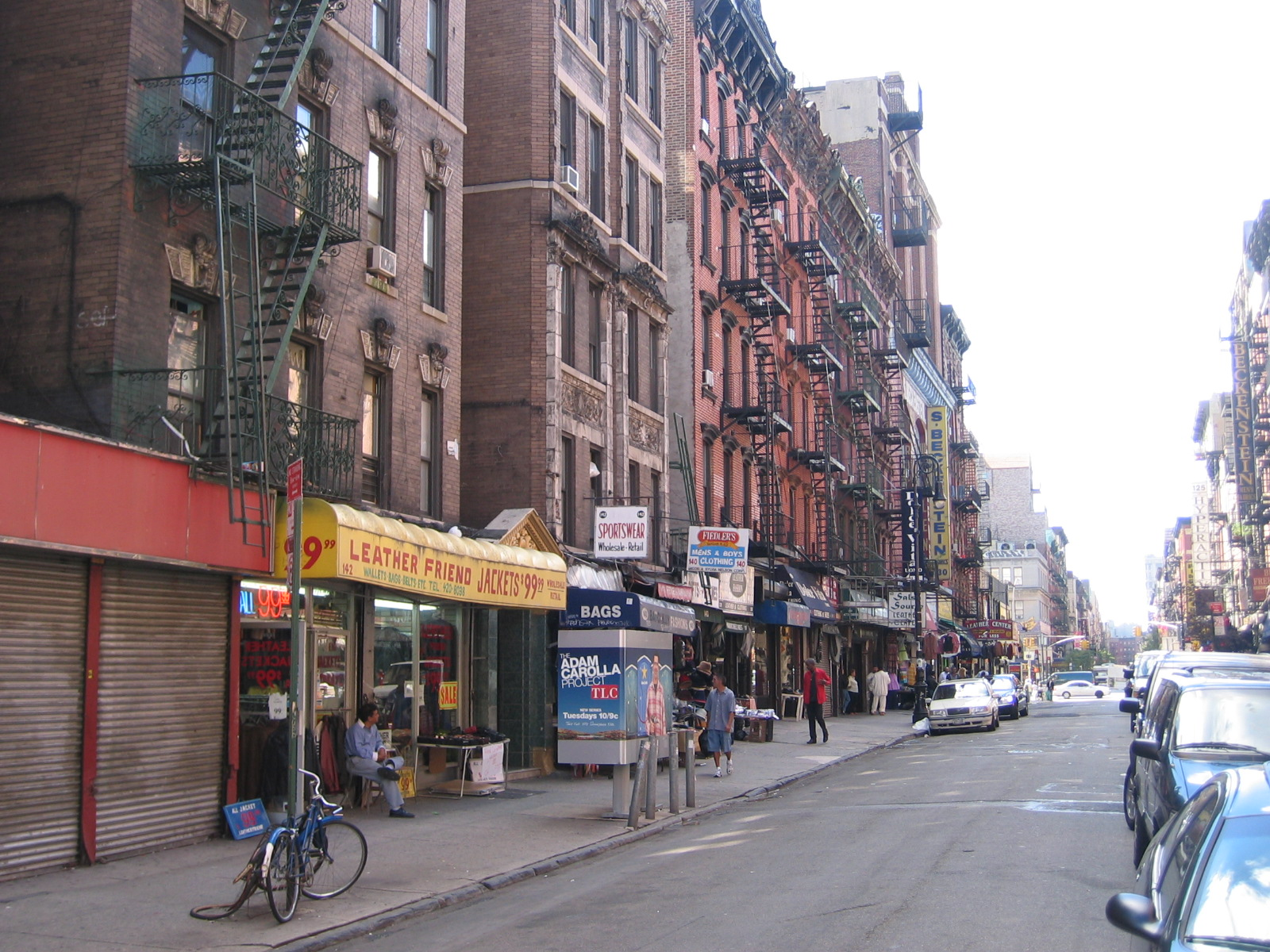
- The corner of Orchard and Rivington Streets on the Lower East Side in 2005
- Interactive map of Lower East Side
- Coordinates: 40.715°N 73.985°W
- Country: United States
- State: New York
- City: New York City
- Borough: Manhattan
- Community District: Manhattan 3

Area
  - Total: 0.58 sq mi (1.5 km^{2})

Population (2020)
  - Total: 49,149
  - Density: 85,000/sq mi (33,000/km^{2})

Ethnicity
  - White: 31.2%
  - Hispanic: 30.7%
  - Asian: 25.0%
  - Black: 8.2%
  - Other: 4.1%

Economics
  - Median income: $51,649
- Time zone: UTC−05:00 (Eastern)
  - Summer (DST): UTC−04:00 (EDT)
- ZIP Codes: 10002
- Area code: 212, 332, 646, and 917
- Lower East Side Historic District
- U.S. National Register of Historic Places
- U.S. Historic district
- Location: Roughly bounded by East Houston, Essex, Canal, Eldridge, South, and Grand Streets, and the Bowery and East Broadway, Manhattan, New York (original); Roughly along Division, Rutgers, Madison, Henry and Grand Streets (increase)
- Coordinates: 40°43′2″N 73°59′23″W
- NRHP reference No.: 00001015 (original); 04000297 (increase)
- Added to NRHP: September 7, 2000 (original); May 2, 2006 (increase)

The Lower East Side, sometimes abbreviated as LES, is a historic neighborhood in the southeastern part of Manhattan in New York City. It is located roughly between the Bowery and the East River from Canal to Houston streets. Historically, it was understood to encompass a much larger area, from Broadway to the East River and from East 14th Street to Fulton and Franklin Streets.

Traditionally an immigrant, working class neighborhood, it began rapid gentrification in the mid-2000s, prompting the National Trust for Historic Preservation to place the neighborhood on their list of America's Most Endangered Places in 2008.

The Lower East Side is part of Manhattan Community District 3, and its primary ZIP Code is 10002. It is patrolled by the 7th Precinct of the New York City Police Department.

== Boundaries ==
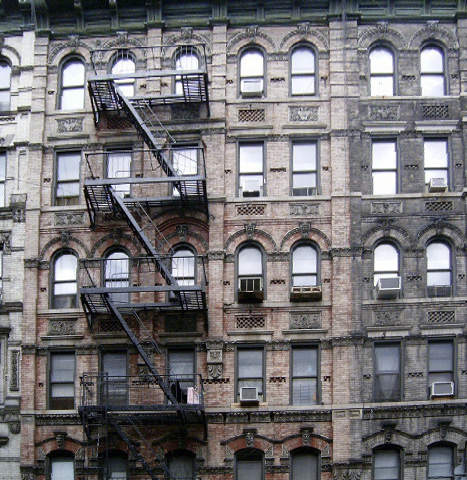
Tenement buildings on the Lower East Side

A more extensive definition of the Lower East Side places its boundaries at East 14th Street on the north, the East River to the east, Fulton and Franklin Streets to the south, and Pearl Street and Broadway to the west. This more extensive definition of the neighborhood includes Chinatown, the East Village, and Little Italy. A less extensive definition has the neighborhood bordered to the south and west by Chinatown – which extends north to roughly Grand Street – to the west by Nolita, and to the north by the East Village.

Historically, the "Lower East Side" referred to the area alongside the East River from about the Manhattan Bridge and Canal Street up to 14th Street, and roughly bounded on the west by Broadway. It included areas known today as East Village, Alphabet City, Chinatown, Bowery, Little Italy, and Nolita. Parts of the East Village are still known as Loisaida, a Latino pronunciation of "Lower East Side".

=== Political representation ===
Politically, the neighborhood is in New York's 10th congressional district. It is in the New York State Assembly's 65th district and 74th district; the New York State Senate's 27th district; and New York City Council's 1st and 2nd districts.

== History ==
=== Prior to Europeans ===
As was true of all of Manhattan Island, the area now known as the Lower East Side was occupied by members of the Lenape tribe, who were organized in bands that moved from place to place according to the seasons, fishing on the rivers in the summer, and moving inland in the fall and winter to gather crops and hunt for food. Their main trail took approximately the route of Broadway. One encampment on the Lower East Side near Corlears Hook was called Rechtauck or Naghtogack.

=== Early settlement ===
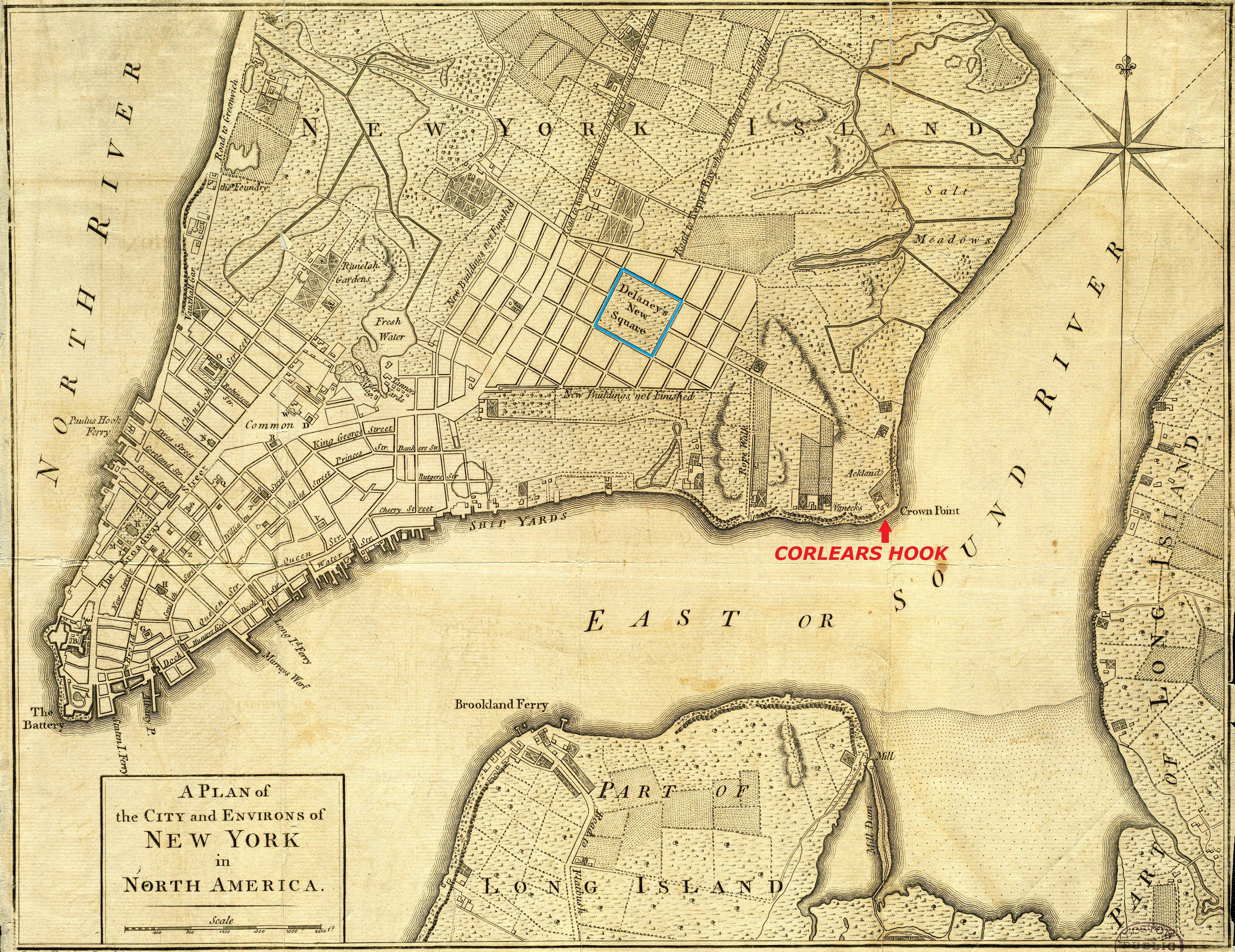
Corlears Hook (red arrow) is Crown Point in this British map of 1776; "Delaney's [sic] New Square" (blue square northwest of Corlears Hook) was never built

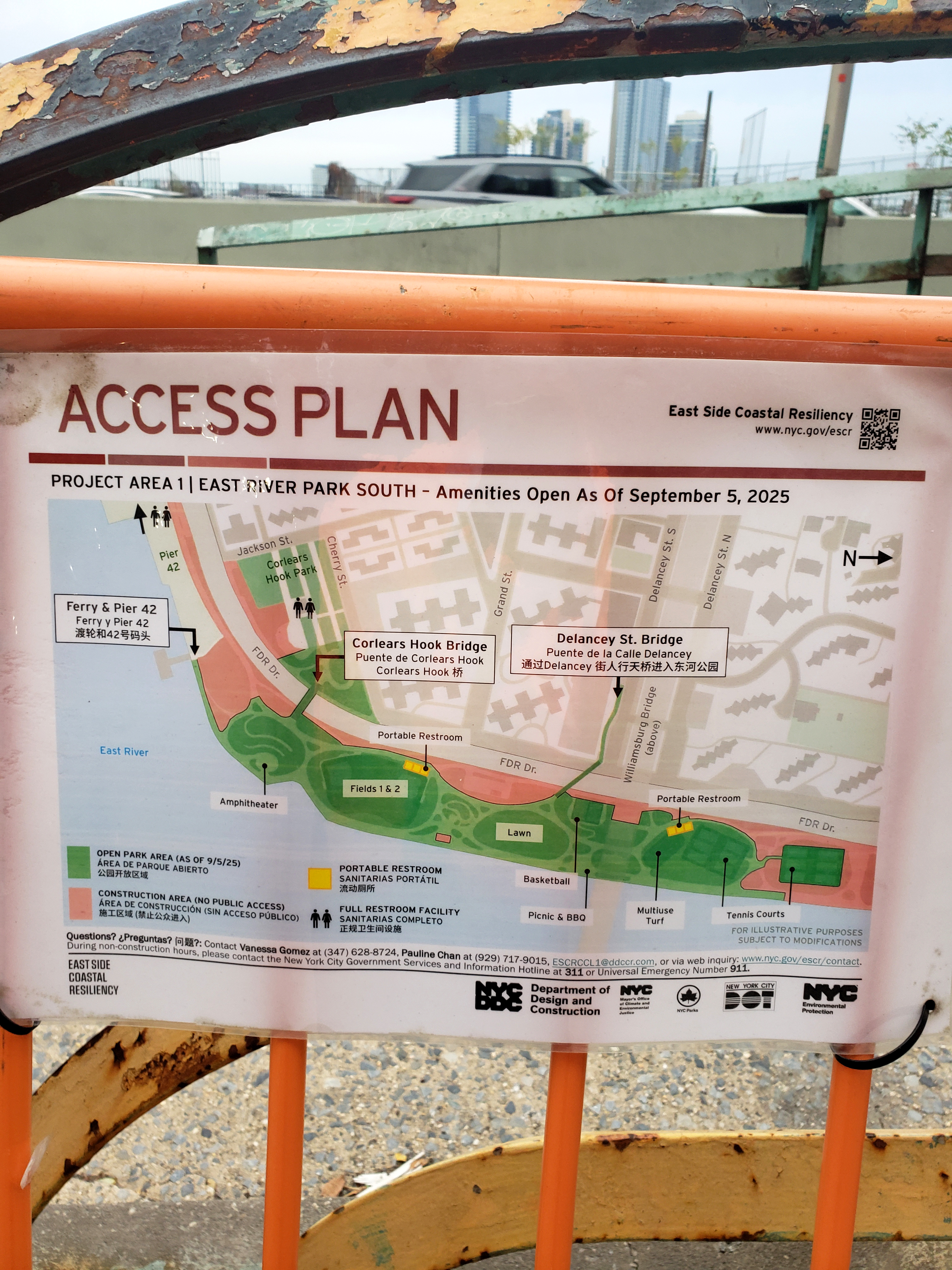
DDC sign showing the public amenities left of East River Park, Corlears Hook Park is center left, late 2025

The population of the Dutch colony of New Amsterdam was located primarily below the current Fulton Street, while north of it were a number of small plantations and large farms called "bouwerij" ("bowery", equivalent to "boerderij" in present-day Dutch). Around these farms were a number of enclaves of free or "half-free" Africans, which served as a buffer between the Dutch and the Native Americans. One of the largest of these was located along the modern Bowery between Prince Street and Astor Place, as well as the "only separate enclave" of this type within Manhattan. These black farmers were some of the earliest settlers of the area.

Gradually, during the 17th century, there was an overall consolidation of the boweries and farms into larger parcels, and much of the Lower East Side was then part of the Delancey farm.

James Delancey's pre-Revolutionary farm east of post road leading from the city (Bowery) survives in the names Delancey Street and Orchard Street. On the modern map of Manhattan, the Delancey farm is represented in the grid of streets from Division Street north to Houston Street. In response to the pressures of a growing city, Delancey began to survey streets in the southern part of the "West Farm" in the 1760s. A spacious projected Delancey Square—intended to cover the area within today's Eldridge, Essex, Hester and Broome Streets—was eliminated when the loyalist Delancey family's property was confiscated after the American Revolution. The city Commissioners of Forfeiture eliminated the aristocratic planned square for a grid, effacing Delancey's vision of a New York laid out like the West End of London.

=== Corlears Hook ===
The point of land on the East River now called Corlears Hook was also called Corlaers Hook under Dutch and British rule and briefly Crown Point during British occupation in the Revolution. It was named after the schoolmaster Jacobus van Corlaer, who settled on this "plantation" that in 1638 was called by a Europeanized version of its Lenape name, Nechtans or Nechtanc. Corlaer sold the plantation to Wilhelmus Hendrickse Beekman (1623–1707), founder of the Beekman family of New York; his son Gerardus Beekman was christened at the plantation on August 17, 1653.

On February 25, 1643, as part of Kieft's War, volunteers from the New Amsterdam colony killed forty Wiechquaesgecks at their encampment in the Massacre at Corlears Hook, in retaliation for ongoing conflicts between the colonists and the natives of the area, including the natives' unwillingness to pay tribute and their refusal to turn over the accused killer of a colonist.

The projection into the East River that retained Corlaer's name was an important landmark for navigators for 300 years. On older maps and documents, it is usually spelled Corlaers Hook, but since the early 19th century, the spelling has been anglicized to Corlears. The rough unplanned settlement that developed at Corlaer's Hook under the British occupation of New York during the Revolution was separated from the densely populated city by rugged hills of glacial till: "this region lay beyond the city proper, from which it was separated by high, uncultivated, and rough hills", observers recalled in 1843.

As early as 1816, Corlears Hook was notorious for streetwalkers, "a resort for the lewd and abandoned of both sexes", and in 1821 its "streets abounding every night with preconcerted groups of thieves and prostitutes" were noted by The Christian Herald. In the course of the 19th century, they came to be called hookers. In the 1832 summer of New York City's cholera epidemic, a two-story wooden workshop in the neighborhood was commandeered to serve as a makeshift cholera hospital; between July 18 and September 15, when the hospital was closed as the epidemic wound down, 281 patients were admitted, both black and white, of whom 93 died.

In 1833, Corlear's Hook was the location of some of the first tenements built in New York City.

Corlears Hook is mentioned on the first page of Chapter 1 of Herman Melville's Moby Dick, first published in 1851: "Circumambulate the city of a dreamy Sabbath afternoon. Go from Corlears Hook to Coenties Slip, and from thence, by Whitehall, northward. What do you see? ..." and again in Chapter 99—The Doubloon.

The original location of Corlears Hook is now obscured by shoreline landfill. It was near the east end of the present pedestrian bridge over the FDR Drive near Cherry Street. The name is preserved in Corlears Hook Park at the intersection of Jackson and Cherry Streets along the East River Drive.

=== Immigration ===
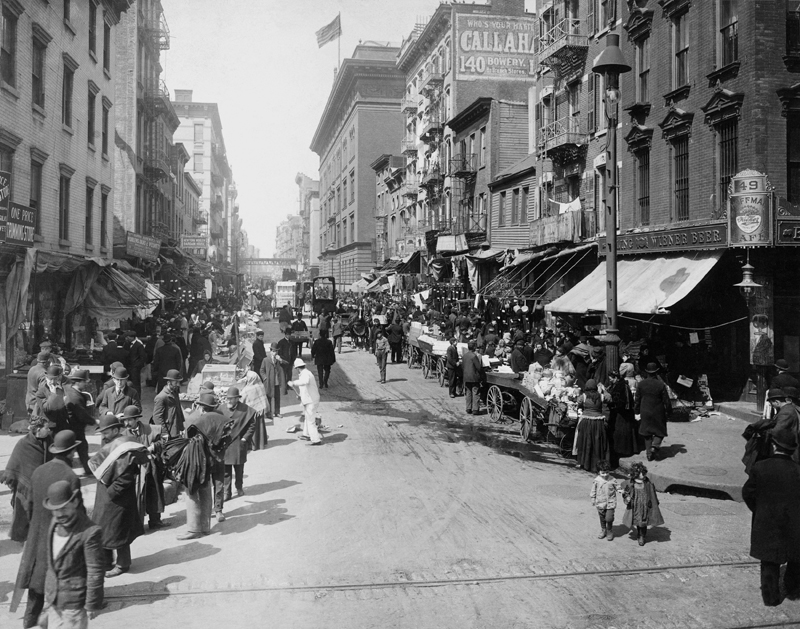
The Lower East Side in the early 1900s

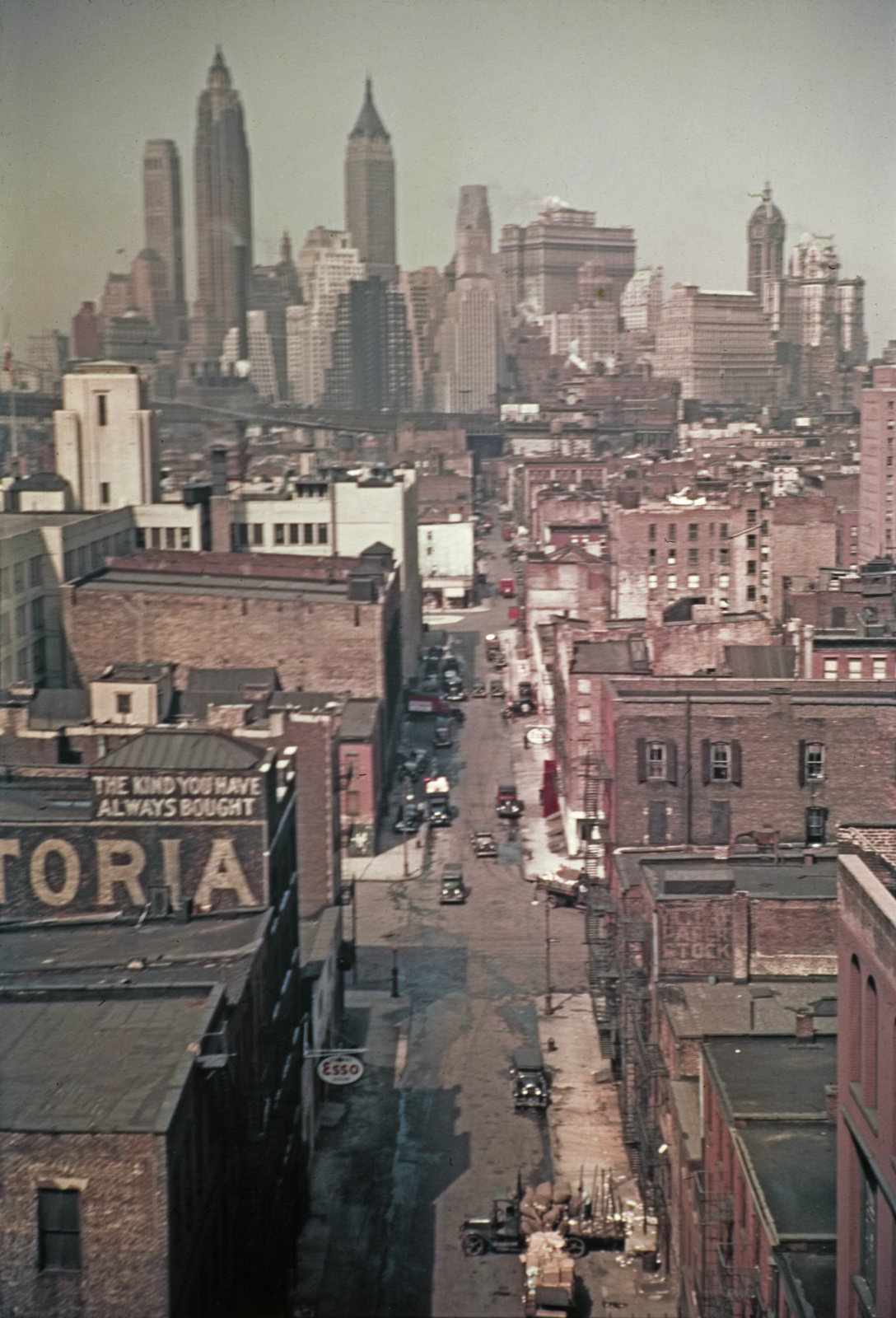
The Lower East Side and Lower Manhattan skyline photographed using Agfacolor in 1938

The bulk of immigrants who came to New York City in the late 19th and early 20th centuries came to the Lower East Side, moving into crowded tenements there. By the 1840s, large numbers of German immigrants settled in the area, and a large part of it became known as "Little Germany" or "Kleindeutschland". This was followed by groups of Italians and Eastern European Jews, as well as Greeks, Hungarians, Poles, Romanians, Russians, Slovaks and Ukrainians, each of whom settled in relatively homogeneous enclaves. By 1920, the Jewish neighborhood was one of the largest of these ethnic groupings, with 400,000 people. Jewish culture was on display in the area, with pushcart vendors and storefronts on Orchard and Grand streets and numerous Yiddish theatres along Second Avenue between Houston and 14th Streets.

Living conditions in these "slum" areas were far from ideal, although some improvement came from a change in the zoning laws, which required "new law" tenements to be built with air shafts between them so that fresh air and some light could reach each apartment. Still, reform movements, such as the one started by Jacob Riis's book How the Other Half Lives, continued to attempt to alleviate the problems of the area through settlement houses, such as the Henry Street Settlement, and other welfare and service agencies. The city itself moved to address the problem when it built First Houses, the first such public housing project in the United States, in 1935–1936. The development, located on the south side of East 3rd Street between First Avenue and Avenue A, and on the west side of Avenue A between East 2nd and East 3rd Streets, is now considered to be located within the East Village.

=== 20th century ===
By the turn of the twentieth century, the neighborhood had become closely associated with radical politics, such as anarchism, socialism, and communism. It was also known as a place where many popular performers had grown up, such as Eddie Cantor, Al Jolson, George and Ira Gershwin, Jimmy Durante, and Irving Berlin. Later, more radical artists such as the Beat poets and writers were drawn to the neighborhood – especially the parts which later became the East Village – by the inexpensive housing and cheap food.

The German population decreased in the early twentieth century as a result of the General Slocum disaster and due to anti-German sentiment prompted by World War I. After World War II, the Lower East Side became New York City's first racially integrated neighborhood with the influx of African Americans and Puerto Ricans. Areas where Spanish speaking was predominant began to be called Loisaida.

By the 1960s, the influence of the Jewish and Eastern European groups declined as many of these residents had left the area, while other ethnic groups had coalesced into separate neighborhoods, such as Little Italy. The Lower East Side then experienced a period of "persistent poverty, crime, drugs, and abandoned housing". A substantial portion of the neighborhood was slated for demolition under the Cooper Square Urban Renewal Plan of 1956, which was to redevelop the area from Ninth to Delancey Streets from the Bowery/Third Avenue to Chrystie Street/Second Avenue with new privately owned cooperative housing. The United Housing Foundation was selected as the sponsor for the project, which faced great opposition from the community. Neither the original large-scale development nor a 1961 revised proposal was implemented, and it was not until 1991 that an agreement was made to redevelop a small portion of the proposed renewal site.

=== East Village split and gentrification ===
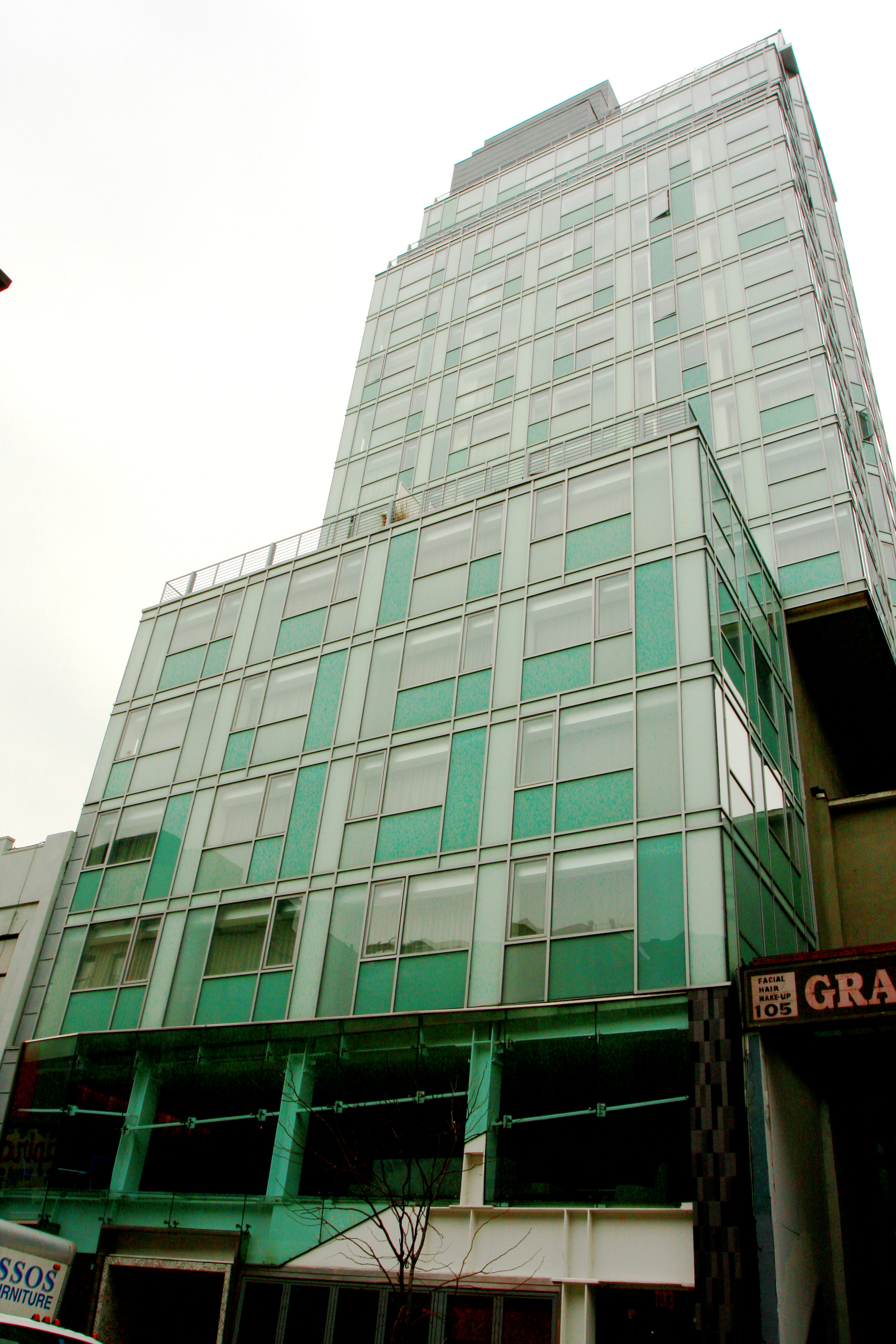
The Hotel on Rivington was completed in 2005

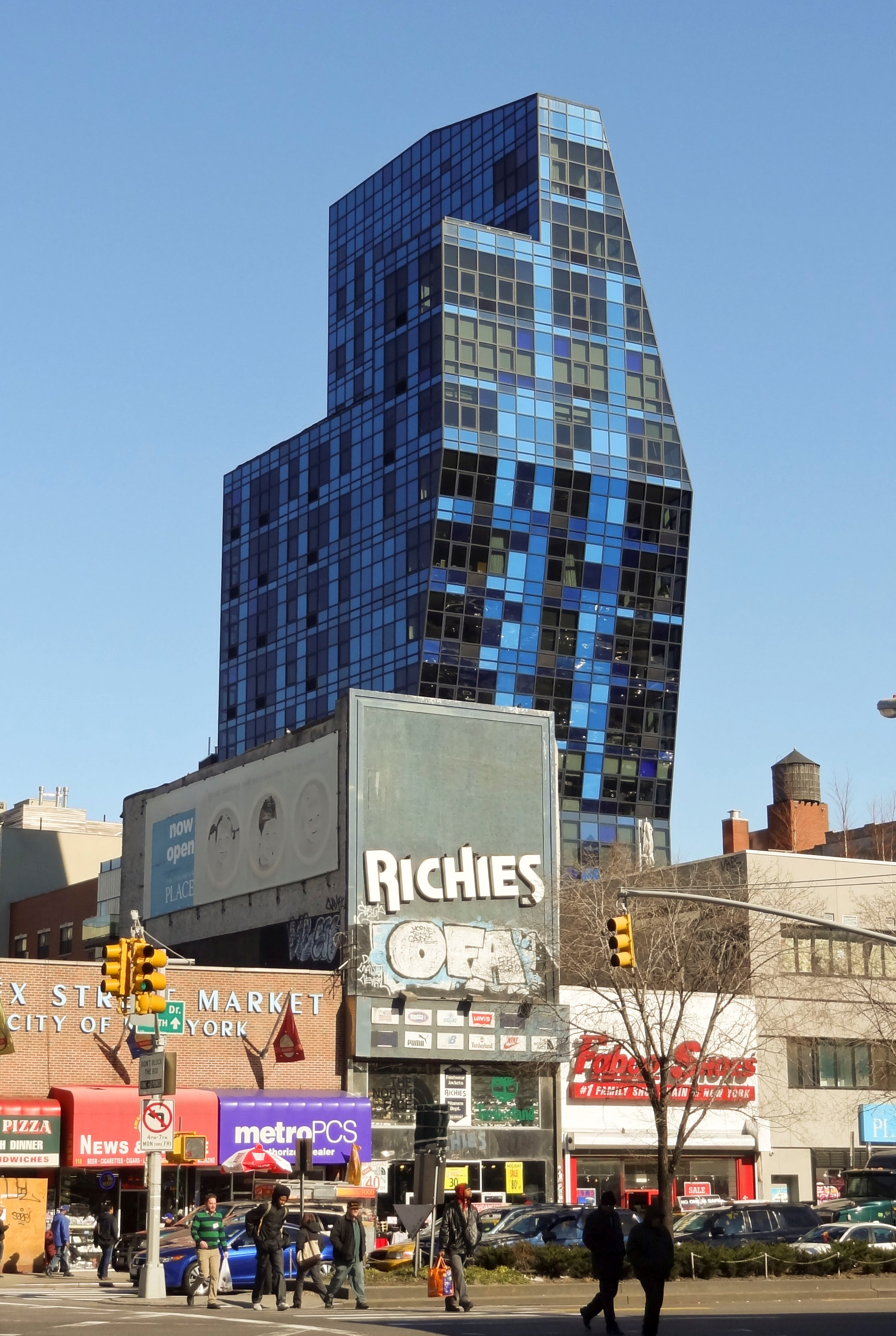
The Blue Condominium was completed in 2007

The East Village was once considered the Lower East Side's northwest corner. However, in the 1960s, the demographics of the area above Houston Street began to change as it became a bohemia for writers, poets, musicians, and artists. Newcomers and real estate brokers popularized the East Village name, and the term was adopted by the popular media by the early-1960s. As the East Village developed a culture separate from the rest of the Lower East Side, the two areas came to be seen as two separate neighborhoods rather than the former being part of the latter.

By the 1980s, the Lower East Side had begun to stabilize after its period of decline, and once again began to attract students, artists, and adventurous members of the middle-class, as well as immigrants from countries such as Taiwan, Indonesia, Bangladesh, China, the Dominican Republic, India, Japan, Korea, the Philippines, and Poland.

In the early 2000s, the gentrification of the East Village spread to the Lower East Side proper, making it one of the trendiest neighborhoods in Manhattan. Orchard Street, despite its "Bargain District" moniker, is now lined with upscale boutiques. Similarly, trendy restaurants, including Clinton Street Baking Company & Restaurant, are found on a stretch of tree-lined Clinton Street that New York Magazine described as the "hippest restaurant row" on the Lower East Side.

In November 2007, the Blue Condominium, a 32-unit, 16-story luxury condominium tower, was completed at 105 Norfolk Street just north of Delancey Street. The pixellated, faceted blue design starkly contrasts with the surrounding neighborhood. Following the construction of the Hotel on Rivington one block away, several luxury condominiums around Houston, and the New Museum on Bowery, this new wave of construction is another sign that the gentrification cycle is entering a high-luxury phase similar to in SoHo and Nolita in the previous decade.

More recently, the gentrification that was previously confined to the north of Delancey Street continued south. Several restaurants, bars, and galleries opened below Delancey Street after 2005, especially around the intersection of Broome and Orchard Streets. The neighborhood's second boutique hotel, Blue Moon Hotel, opened on Orchard Street just south of Delancey Street in early 2006. However, unlike The Hotel on Rivington, the Blue Moon used an existing tenement building, and its exterior is almost identical to neighboring buildings. In September 2013, it was announced that the Essex Crossing redevelopment project was to be built in the area, centered around the intersection of Essex and Delancey Streets, but mostly utilizing land south of Delancey Street.

== Demographics ==
The census tabulation area for the Lower East Side is bounded to the north by Houston Street and to the west by the Bowery, Essex Street, and Montgomery Street. According to the 2020 United States Census, the population of Lower East Side was 49,149, an increase of 1,725 (3.6%) from the 47,424 counted in 2010. Covering an area of 373.8 acres (151.3 ha), the neighborhood had a population density of 131.5 inhabitants per acre (84,200/sq mi; 32,500/km^{2}). The racial makeup of the neighborhood was 28.6% (13,578) White, 9.2% (3,890) African American, 25.0% (13,009) Asian, 1.0% (467) from other races, and 3.1% (1,500) from two or more races. Hispanic or Latino residents of any race were 33.6% (15,930) of the population.

The racial composition of the Lower East Side changed moderately from 2000 to 2010, with the most significant changes being the White population's increase by 18% (2,514), the Asian population's increase by 10% (1,673), and the Hispanic / Latino population's decrease by 10% (3,219). The minority Black population experienced a slight increase by 1% (41), while the very small population of all other races decreased by 17% (310).

The Lower East Side lies in Manhattan Community District 3, which encompasses the Lower East Side, the East Village and Chinatown. Community District 3 had 171,103 inhabitants as of NYC Health's 2018 Community Health Profile, with an average life expectancy of 82.2 years. This is higher than the median life expectancy of 81.2 for all New York City neighborhoods. Most inhabitants are adults: a plurality (35%) are between the ages of 25–44, while 25% are between 45–64, and 16% are 65 or older. The ratio of youth and college-aged residents was lower, at 13% and 11%, respectively.

As of 2017, the median household income in Community District 3 was $39,584, though the median income on the Lower East Side individually was $51,649. In 2018, an estimated 18% of Community District 3 residents lived in poverty, compared to 14% in all of Manhattan and 20% in all of New York City. One in twelve residents (8%) were unemployed, compared to 7% in Manhattan and 9% in New York City. Rent burden, or the percentage of residents who have difficulty paying their rent, is 48% in Community District 3, compared to the boroughwide and citywide rates of 45% and 51%, respectively. Based on this calculation, as of 2018, Community District 3 was considered to be gentrifying: according to the Community Health Profile, the district was low-income in 1990 and has seen above-median rent growth up to 2010.

== Culture ==
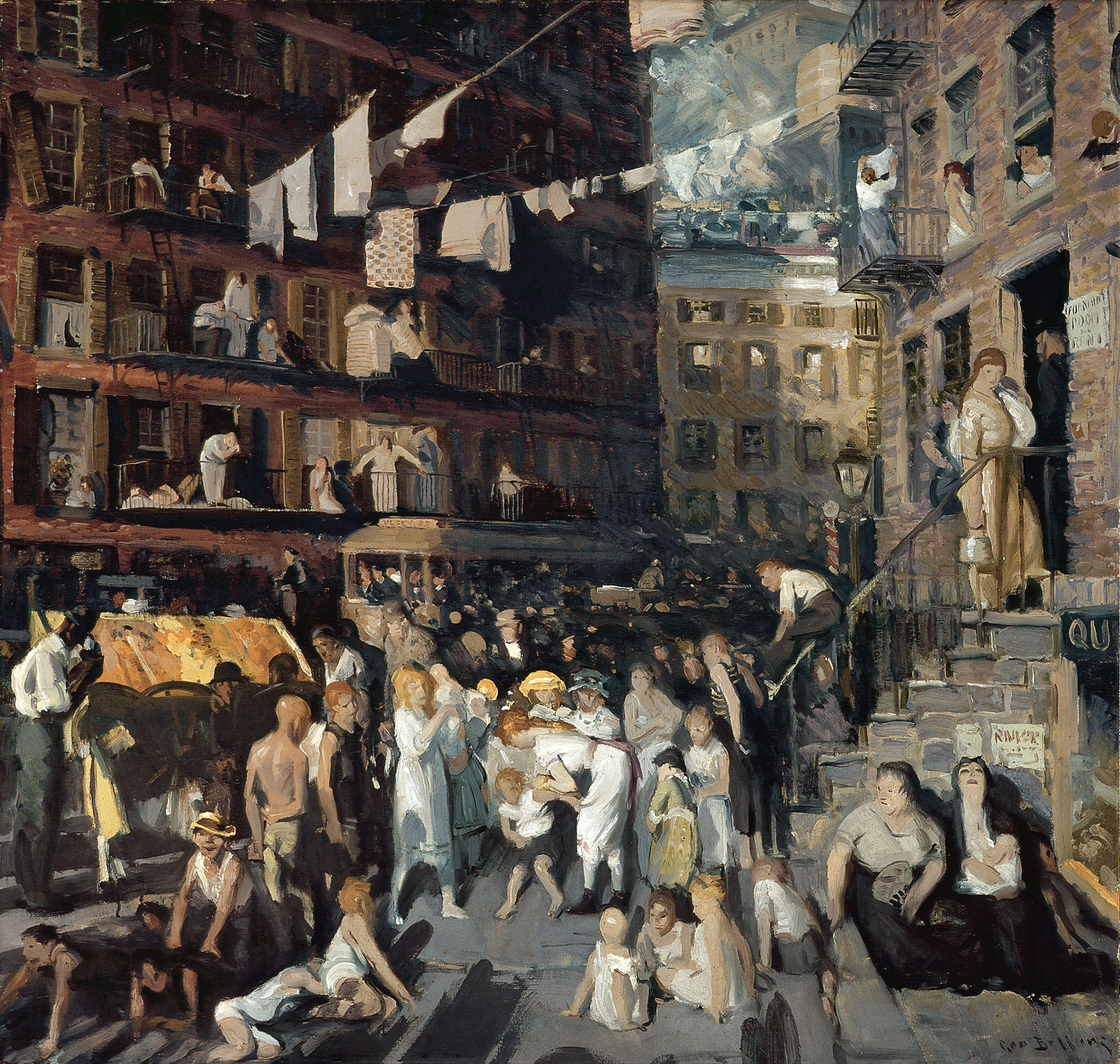
"Cliff Dwellers" by George Bellows, depicting the Lower East Side as it was in the early 20th century

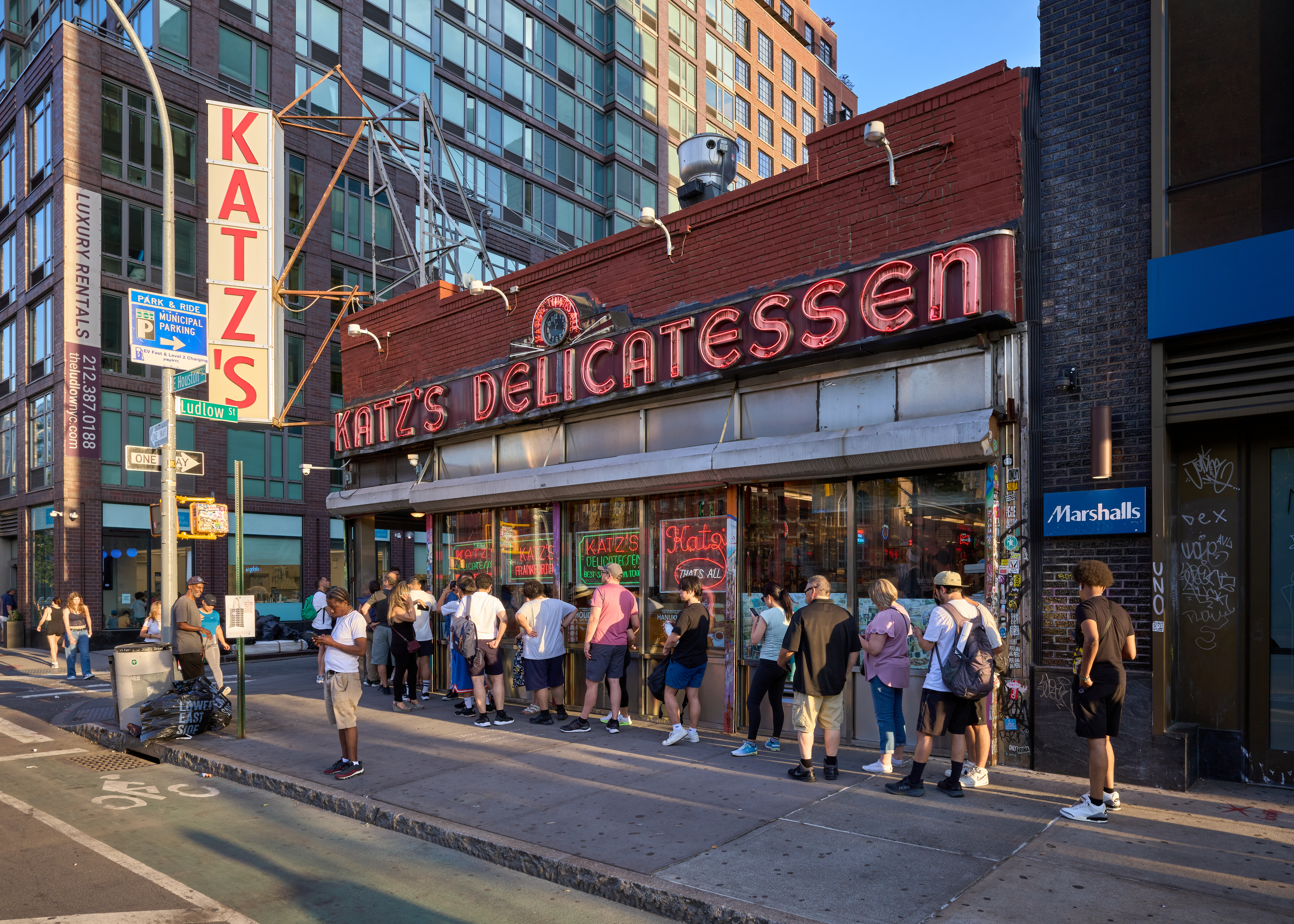
Katz's Delicatessen, a symbol of the neighborhood's Jewish cultural history

=== Immigrant neighborhood ===
One of the oldest neighborhoods of the city, the Lower East Side has long been a lower-class worker neighborhood and often a poor and ethnically diverse section of New York. As well as Irish, Italians, Poles, Ukrainians, Romanians and other ethnic groups, it once had a sizeable German population and was known as Little Germany (Kleindeutschland). Today it is a predominantly Puerto Rican and Dominican community, and in the process of gentrification (as documented by the portraits of its residents in the Clinton+Rivington chapter of The Corners Project.)

Since the immigration waves from Eastern Europe in the late 19th and early 20th century, the Lower East Side became known as having been a center of Jewish immigrant culture. In her 2000 book Lower East Side Memories: A Jewish Place in America, Hasia Diner explains that the Lower East Side is especially remembered as a place of Jewish beginnings for Ashkenazi American Jewish culture. Vestiges of the area's Jewish heritage exist in shops on Hester and Essex Streets, and on Grand Street near Allen Street. An Orthodox Jewish community is based in the area, operating yeshiva day schools and a mikvah. A few Judaica shops can be found along Essex Street, as are a few Jewish scribes and variety stores. Some kosher delis and bakeries, as well as a few "kosher style" delis, including the famous Katz's Deli, are located in the neighborhood. Second Avenue on the Lower East Side was home to many Yiddish theatre productions in the Yiddish Theater District during the early part of the 20th century, and Second Avenue came to be known as “Yiddish Broadway”, even though most of the theaters are now gone. Songwriter Irving Berlin, actor John Garfield, and singer Eddie Cantor grew up here.

Since the mid-20th century, the area has been settled primarily by immigrants, primarily from Latin America, especially Central America and Puerto Rico. They have established their own groceries and shops, marketing goods from their culture and cuisine. Bodegas have replaced Jewish shops, and there are mostly Roman Catholics.

In what is now the East Village, earlier populations of Poles and Ukrainians have moved on and been largely supplanted by newer immigrants. The immigration of numerous Japanese people over the last fifteen years or so has led to the proliferation of Japanese restaurants and specialty food markets. There is also a notable population of Bangladeshis and other immigrants from Muslim countries, many of whom are congregants of the small Madina Masjid, a mosque on First Avenue and 11th Street.

The neighborhood still has many historic synagogues, such as the Bialystoker Synagogue, Beth Hamedrash Hagadol, the Eldridge Street Synagogue, Kehila Kedosha Janina (the only Greek synagogue in the Western Hemisphere), the Angel Orensanz Center (the fourth oldest synagogue building in the United States), and various smaller synagogues along East Broadway. Another landmark, the First Roumanian-American congregation (the Rivington Street Synagogue), partially collapsed in 2006 and was subsequently demolished. In addition, there is a major Hare Krishna temple and several Buddhist houses of worship.

Chinese residents have also been moving into Lower East Side, and since the late 20th century, they have comprised a large immigrant group in the area. The part of the neighborhood south of Delancey Street and west of Allen Street has, in large measure, become part of Chinatown. Grand Street is one of the major business and shopping streets of Chinatown. Also contained within the neighborhood are strips of lighting and restaurant supply shops on the Bowery.

==== Jewish neighborhood ====
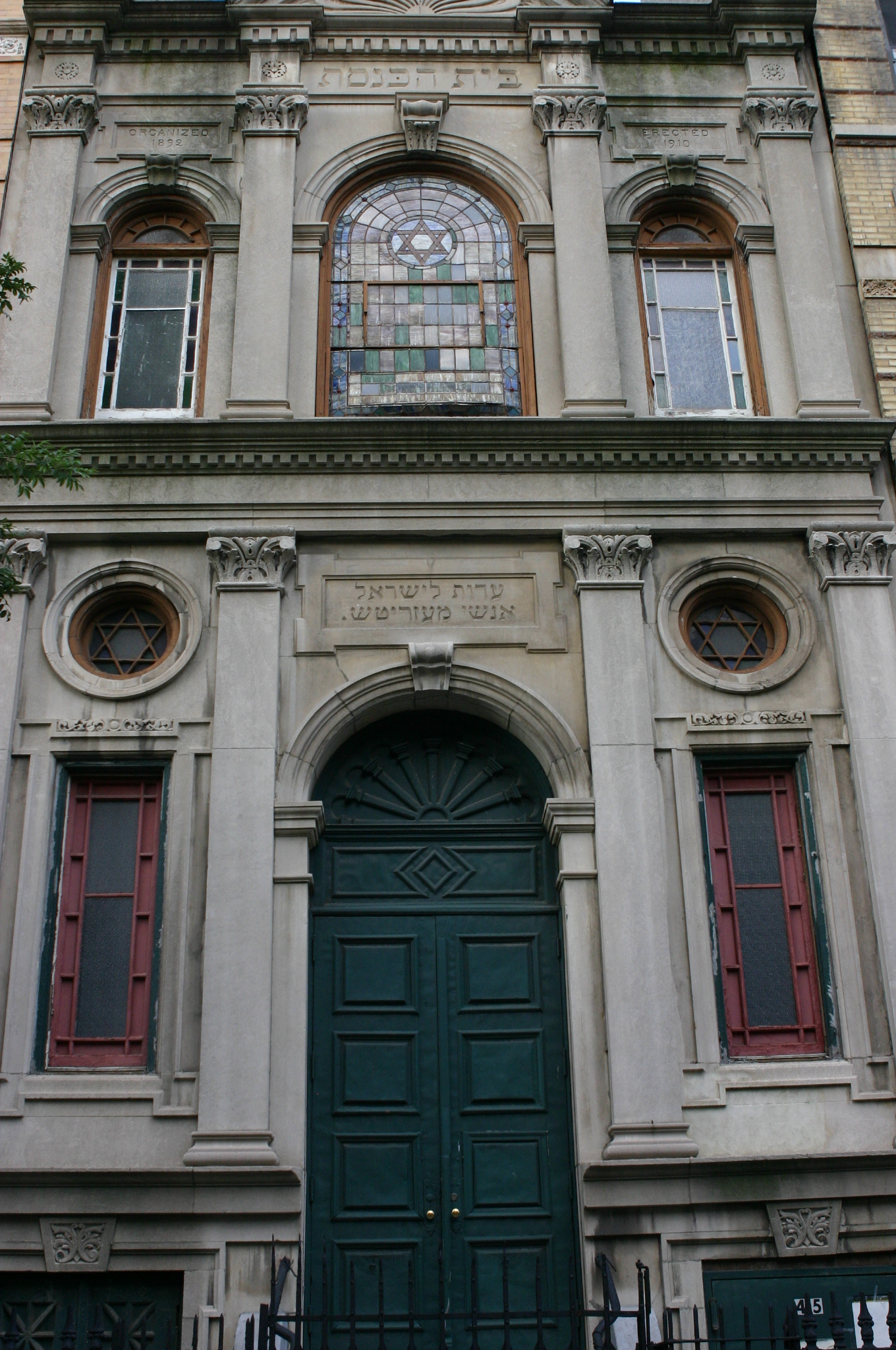
Meseritz Synagogue

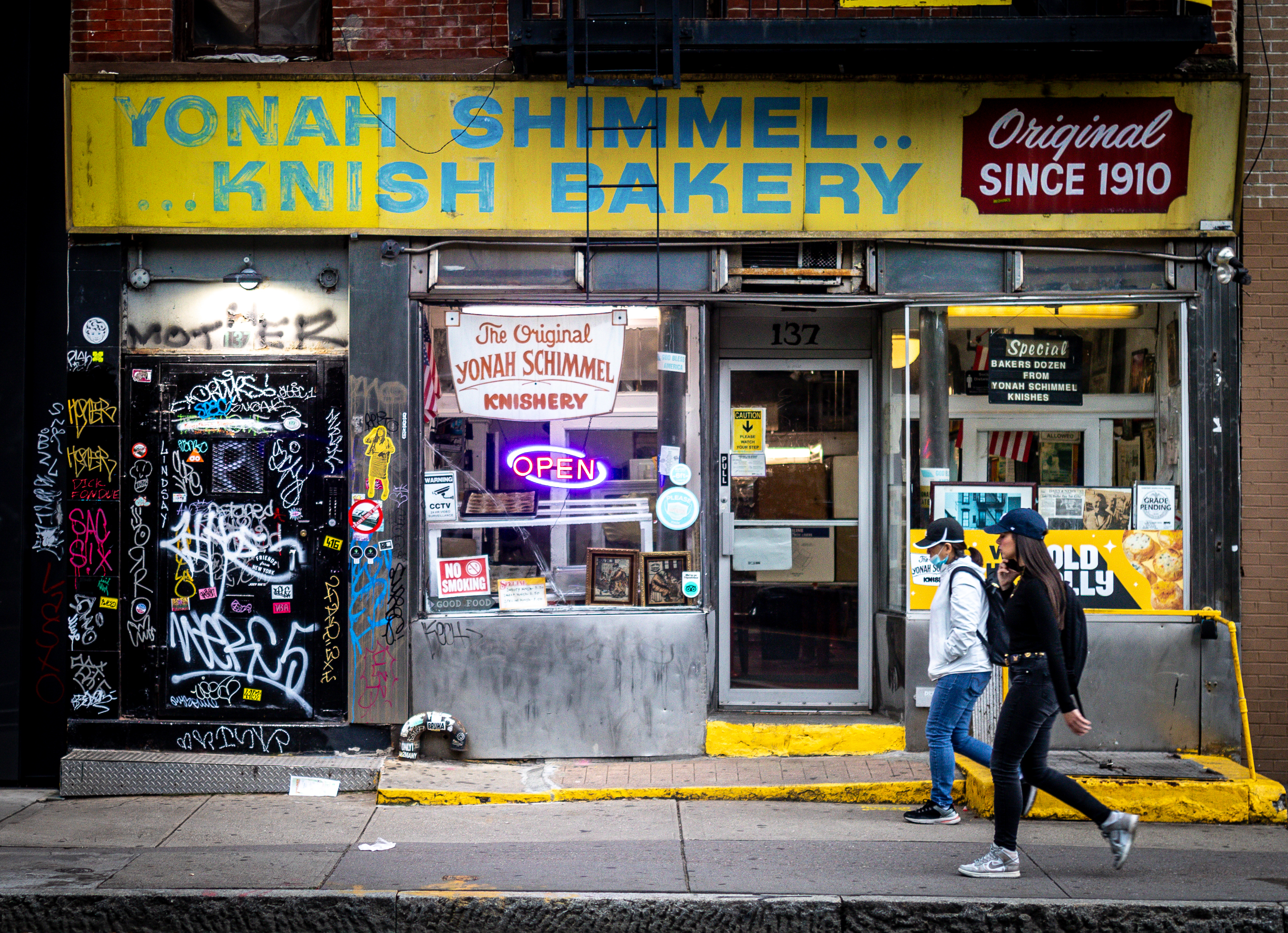
Yonah Schimmel's Knish Bakery

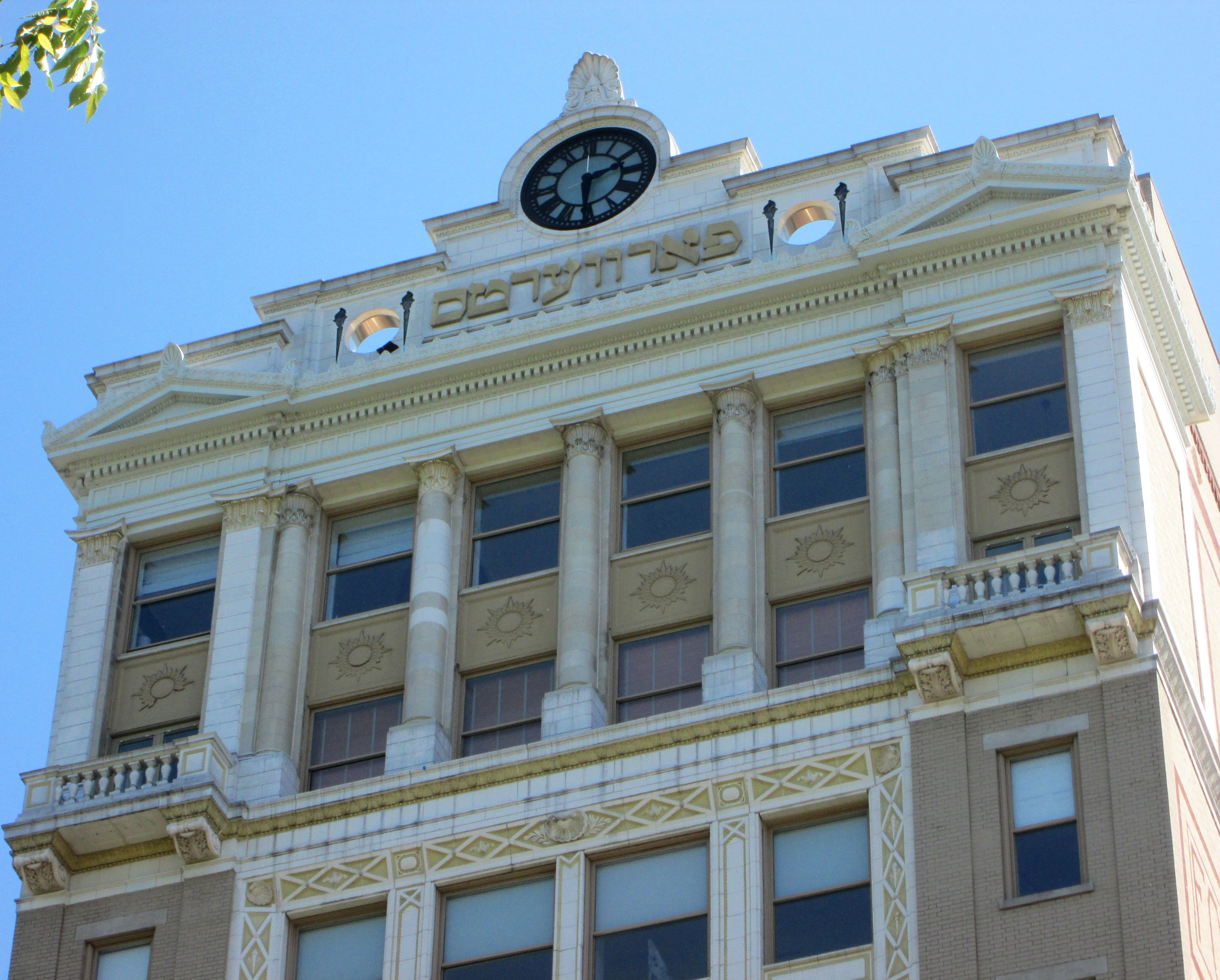
Forward Building

While the Lower East Side has been a place of successive immigrant populations, many American Jews relate to the neighborhood in a strong manner, and Chinatown holds a special place in the imagination of Chinese Americans, just as Astoria in Queens holds a place in the hearts of Greek Americans. It was a hub for ancestors of many people in the metropolitan area, and much depicted in fiction and films.

Mesivtha Tifereth Jerusalem, established in 1907, was long led by Moshe Feinstein.

In the late 20th century, Jewish communities have worked to preserve a number of buildings historically associated with the Jewish immigrant community. Notable sites include:

- The Educational Alliance Settlement house – 175 East Broadway
- Henry Street Settlement – 263–267 Henry Street and 466 Grand Street
- University Settlement House – 184 Eldridge Street
- Katz's Deli – 205 East Houston Street
- Guss' Pickles – 87 Orchard Street
- Kossar's Bialys – 367 Grand Street
- Gertel's Bake Shop – formerly at 53 Hester Street from 1914 until it closed in 2007
- Knickerbocker Village – 10 Monroe Street
- Streit's Matzo Co. – 150 Rivington Street
- Yonah Schimmel's Knish Bakery – 137 East Houston Street
- Mendel Goldberg Fabrics, since 1890 – 72 Hester Street
- Harris Levy Fine Linens, since 1894 – 98 Forsyth Street
- Russ & Daughters – 179 East Houston Street
- Schapiro's Kosher Wine – Essex Street Market
- Forward Building – 173-175 East Broadway
- Jarmulowsky Bank Building – 54-58 Canal Street, 5-9 Orchard Street

Synagogues include:

- Adath Jeshurun of Jassy Synagogue – 58-60 Rivington Street
- Bialystoker Synagogue – 7–11 Willet Street, originally built in the Greek Revival style for the Willett Street Methodist Episcopal Church in 1826, and acquired in 1905 for the Orthodox Jewish congregation.
- Beth Hamedrash Hagadol – 60–64 Norfolk Street
- Eldridge Street Synagogue – 12 Eldridge Street
- Kehila Kedosha Janina – 280 Broome Street
- Angel Orensanz Center – the fourth-oldest synagogue building in the United States
- Congregation Chasam Sopher – 10 Clinton Street
- Congregation Chevra Kadisha Anshe Sochaczew – 121 Ludlow Street
- Meseritz Synagogue – 415 East 6th Street
- Podhajcer Shul – 108 East First Street
- Stanton Street Synagogue – 180 Stanton Street
- Boyaner kloiz at 247 East Broadway, opened in 1928 by the Boyaner Rebbe of New York

==== Little Fuzhou, Chinatown ====
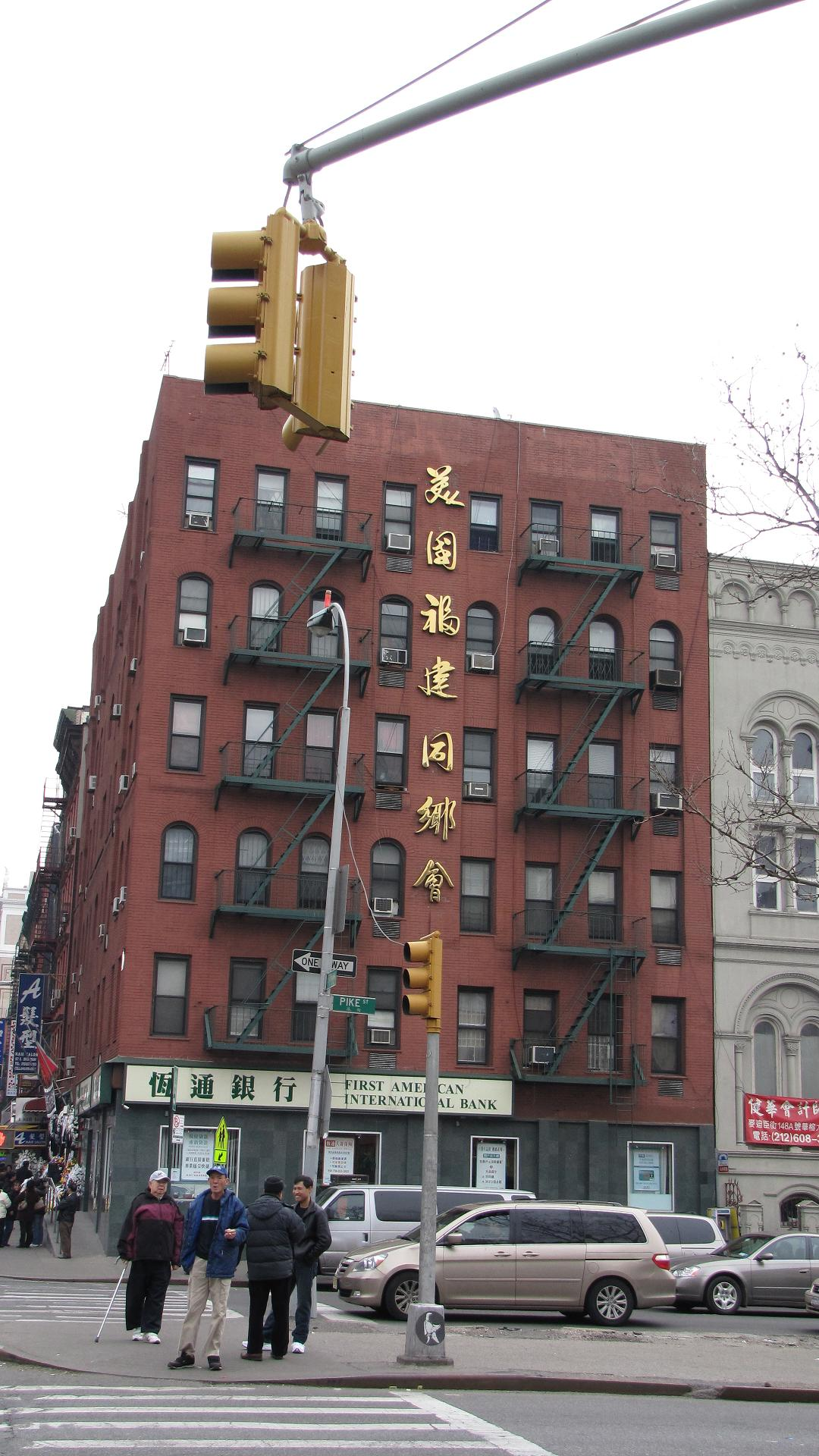
Little Fuzhou in the Chinatown section of the Lower East Side has the highest concentration of Chinese people in the Western Hemisphere.

Little Fuzhou (Chinese: 小福州; pinyin: Xiǎo Fúzhōu; Foochow Romanized: Siēu-hók-ciŭ), or Fuzhou Town (Chinese: 福州埠; pinyin: Fúzhōu Bù; Foochow Romanized: Hók-ciŭ-pú) is a neighborhood within the eastern sliver of Chinatown, in the Two Bridges and Lower East Side areas of Manhattan. Starting in the 1980s and by the 1990s, the neighborhood became a prime destination for immigrants from Fuzhou, Fujian, China. Manhattan's Little Fuzhou is centered on East Broadway. However, since the 2000s, Chinatown, Brooklyn became New York City's new primary destination for Fuzhou immigrants, resulting in a second Little Fuzhou that has far surpassed the original as the Fuzhou cultural center of the New York metropolitan area, and is still rapidly growing in contrast to Manhattan's Little Fuzhou that is shrinking under gentrification.

Since the 2010s, the Fuzhou immigrant population and businesses have been declining throughout the whole eastern portion of Manhattan's Chinatown due to gentrification. There is a rapidly increasing influx of high-income, often non-Chinese, professionals moving into this area, including high-end hipster-owned businesses.

=== Art ===
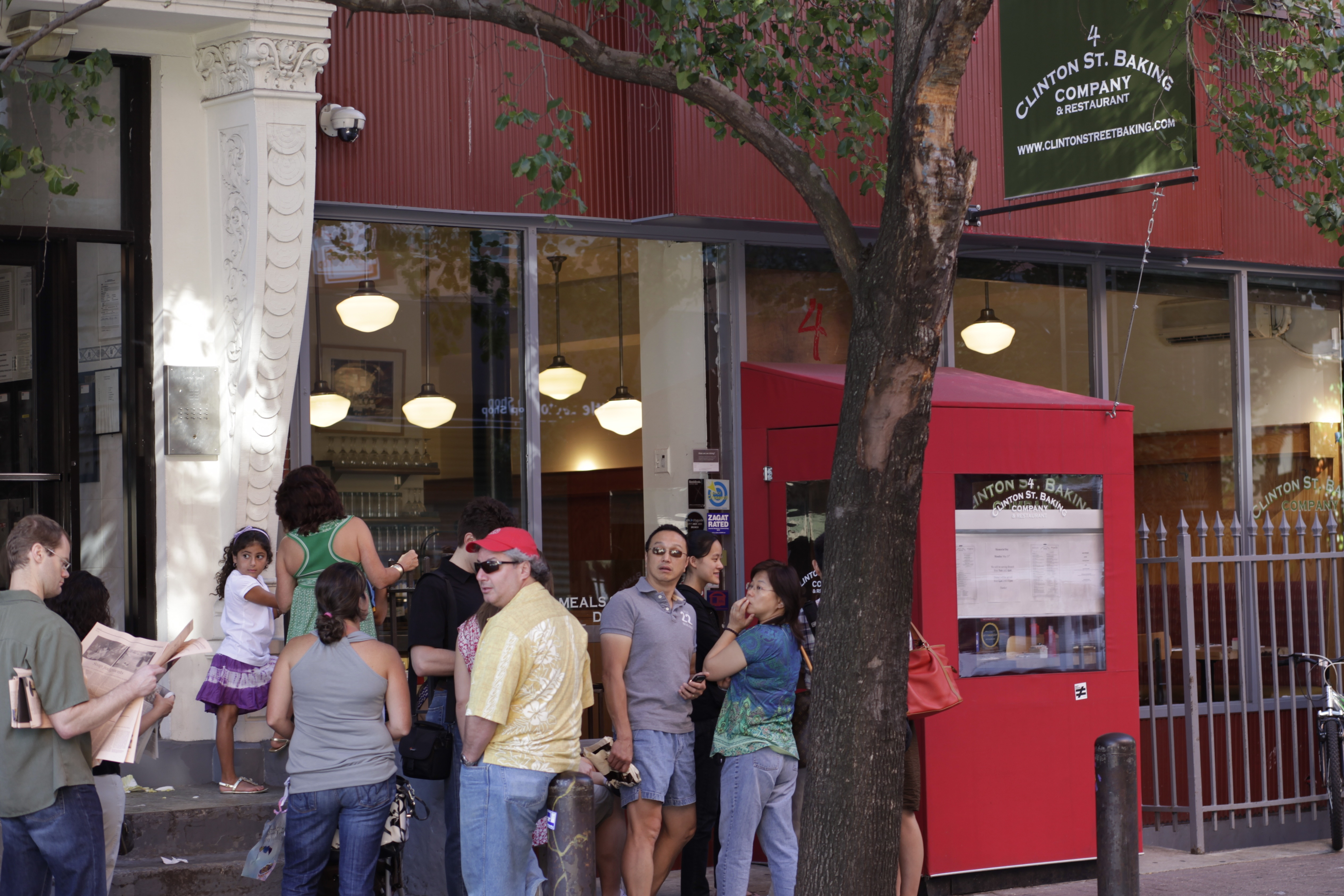
Line of patrons at the Clinton Street Baking Company & Restaurant in 2010

The neighborhood has become home to numerous contemporary art galleries. One of the first was ABC No Rio. Begun by a group of Colab no wave artists (some living on Ludlow Street), ABC No Rio opened an outsider gallery space that invited community participation and encouraged the widespread production of art. Taking an activist approach to art that grew out of The Real Estate Show (the take over of an abandoned building by artists to open an outsider gallery only to have it chained closed by the police) ABC No Rio kept its sense of activism, community, and outsiderness. The product of this open, expansive approach to art was a space for creating new works that did not have links to the art market place and that were able to explore new artistic possibilities.

Other outsider galleries sprung up throughout the Lower East Side and East Village—some 200 at the height of the scene in the 1980s, including the 124 Ridge Street Gallery among others. In December 2007, the New Museum relocated to a brand-new, critically acclaimed building on Bowery at Prince. A growing number of galleries are opening in the Bowery neighborhood to be in close proximity to the museum. The Museum of Reclaimed Urban Space, which opened in 2012, exhibits photography featuring the neighborhood in addition to chronicling its history of activism.

Social service agencies like Henry Street Settlement and Educational Alliance have visual and performing arts programs, the former at Abrons Arts Center, a home for contemporary interdisciplinary arts.

The neighborhood is also home to several graffiti artists, such as Chico and Jean-Michel Basquiat.

=== Nightlife and live music ===
As the neighborhood has gentrified and become safer at night, it has transformed into a popular late-night destination. Orchard, Ludlow and Essex between Rivington Street and Stanton Street have become especially packed at night, and the resulting noise is a cause of tension between bar owners and longtime residents.

LES is a nightlife hub, with one of the densest concentrations of bars in Manhattan, and a four block area bounded by Allen Street, Houston Street, Delancey Street and Essex Street has been nicknamed "Hell Square" due to the late night crowds, party energy, and rowdy noise.

Furthermore, as gentrification continues, many established landmarks and venues have been lost.

The Lower East Side is also home to many live music venues. Punk bands played at C-Squat and alternative rock bands play at Bowery Ballroom on Delancey Street and Mercury Lounge on East Houston Street. Punk bands play at Otto's Shrunken Head and R-Bar. Punk and alternative bands play at Bowery Electric just north of the old CBGB's location. There are also bars that offer performance space, such as Pianos on Ludlow Street and Arlene's Grocery on Stanton Street.

The Lower East Side is the location of the Slipper Room, a burlesque, variety and vaudeville theatre on Orchard and Stanton. Lady Gaga, Leonard Cohen and U2 have all appeared there, while popular downtown performers—including Dirty Martini, Murray Hill, and Matt Fraser—often appear. Variety shows are regularly hosted by comedians James Habacker, Bradford Scobie, Matthew Holtzclaw, and Matt Roper, under the guise of various characters. The Lower East Side has also been mentioned in several songs, including "Les" by Childish Gambino, "L.E.S Artistes" by Santigold and “L.E.S. Girl” by Madonna.

== Police and crime ==
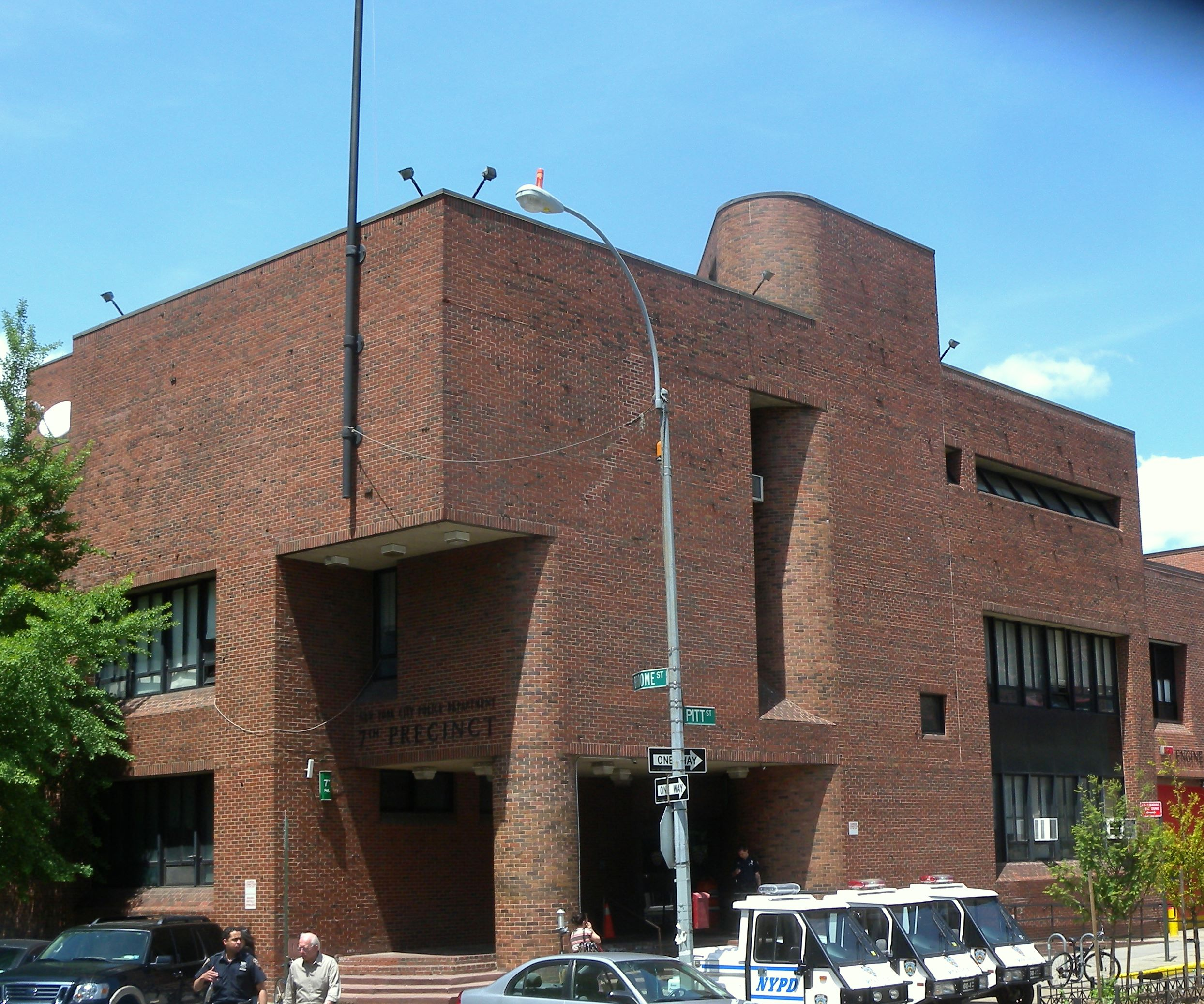
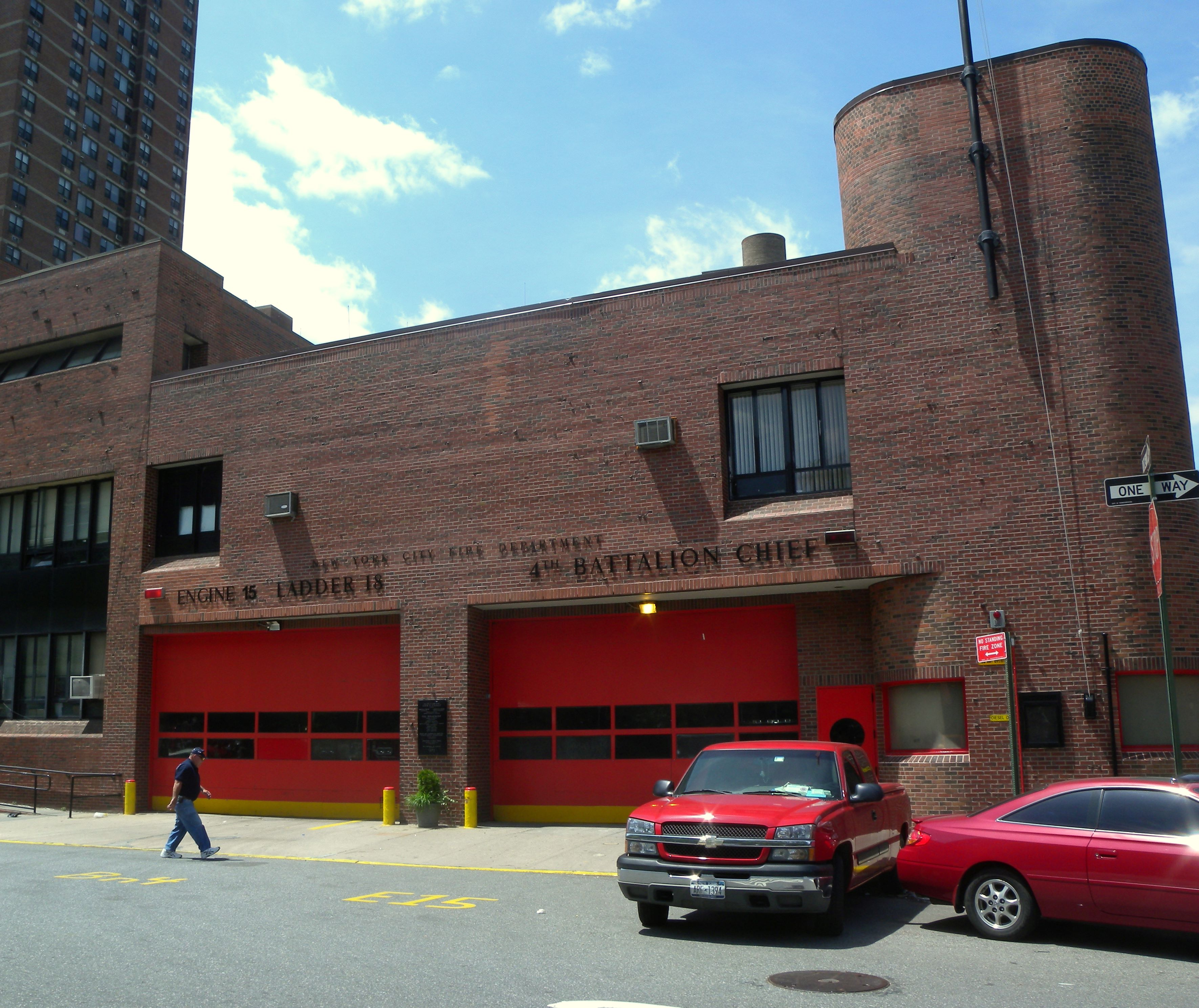
The NYPD 7th Precinct (top) and FDNY Engine Co. 15/Ladder Co. 18/Battalion 4 (bottom) are housed in the same building

The Lower East Side is patrolled by the 7th Precinct of the NYPD, located at 19 1/2 Pitt Street. The 7th Precinct, along with the neighboring 5th Precinct, ranked 48th safest out of 69 patrol areas for per-capita crime in 2010. As of 2018, with a non-fatal assault rate of 42 per 100,000 people, the Lower East Side and East Village's rate of violent crimes per capita is less than that of the city as a whole. The incarceration rate of 449 per 100,000 people is higher than that of the city as a whole.

The 7th Precinct has a lower crime rate than in the 1990s, with crimes across all categories having decreased by 64.8% between 1990 and 2019. The precinct reported 0 murders, 7 rapes, 149 robberies, 187 felony assaults, 94 burglaries, 507 grand larcenies, and 18 grand larcenies auto in 2019.

== Fire safety ==
The Lower East Side is served by two New York City Fire Department (FDNY) fire stations:

- Engine Company 15/Ladder Company 18/Battalion 4 – 25 Pitt Street
- Engine Company 9/Ladder Company 6 – 75 Canal Street

== Health ==
As of 2018, preterm births and births to teenage mothers are less common on the Lower East Side than in other places citywide. On the Lower East Side, there were 82 preterm births per 1,000 live births (compared to 87 per 1,000 citywide), and 10.1 births to teenage mothers per 1,000 live births (compared to 19.3 per 1,000 citywide). The Lower East Side and East Village have a low population of residents who are uninsured. In 2018, this population of uninsured residents was estimated to be 11%, slightly less than the citywide rate of 12%.

The concentration of fine particulate matter, the deadliest type of air pollutant, on the Lower East Side is 0.0089 milligrams per cubic metre (8.9×10^{−9} oz/ft^{3}), more than the city average. Twenty percent of Lower East Side and East Village residents are smokers, which is more than the city average of 14% of residents being smokers. On the Lower East Side, 10% of residents are obese, 11% are diabetic, and 22% have high blood pressure—compared to the citywide averages of 24%, 11%, and 28% respectively. In addition, 16% of children are obese, compared to the citywide average of 20%.

Eighty-eight percent of residents eat some fruits and vegetables every day, which is about the same as the city's average of 87%. In 2018, 70% of residents described their health as "good", "very good", or "excellent", less than the city's average of 78%. For every supermarket on the Lower East Side, there are 18 bodegas.

The nearest major hospitals are the Bellevue Hospital Center and NYU Langone Medical Center in Kips Bay, and NewYork-Presbyterian Lower Manhattan Hospital in the Civic Center area. Beth Israel Medical Center in Stuyvesant Town operated until 2025. In addition, FDNY EMS Division 1/Station 4 is located on Pier 39.

== Post offices and ZIP Code ==
The Lower East Side is located within the ZIP Code 10002. The United States Postal Service operates two post offices on the Lower East Side:

- Knickerbocker Station – 128 East Broadway
- Pitt Station – 185 Clinton Street

== Education ==
New York Public Library's Seward Park branch, fall 2026

The Lower East Side and East Village generally have a higher rate of college-educated residents than the rest of the city as of 2018. A plurality of residents age 25 and older (48%) have a college education or higher, while 24% have less than a high school education and 28% are high school graduates or have some college education. By contrast, 64% of Manhattan residents and 43% of city residents have a college education or higher. The percentage of Lower East Side and East Village students excelling in math rose from 61% in 2000 to 80% in 2011, and reading achievement increased from 66% to 68% during the same time period.

The Lower East Side and East Village's rate of elementary school student absenteeism is lower than the rest of New York City. On the Lower East Side, 16% of elementary school students missed twenty or more days per school year, less than the citywide average of 20%. Additionally, 77% of high school students on the Lower East Side graduate on time, more than the citywide average of 75%.

=== Schools ===
The New York City Department of Education operates public schools on the Lower East Side as part of Community School District 1. District 1 does not contain any zoned schools, which means that students living in District 1 can apply to any school in the district, including those in the East Village.

The following public elementary schools are located on the Lower East Side, serving grades PK-5 unless otherwise indicated:

- New Explorations Into Science Tech and Math (NEST+m) (grades K-12)
- PS 1 Alfred E Smith
- PS 2 Meyer London
- PS 20 Anna Silver
- PS 42 Benjamin Altman
- PS 110 Florence Nightingale
- PS 134 Henrietta Szold
- PS 142 Amalia Castro

The following public elementary/middle schools are located on the Lower East Side, serving grades PK-8 unless otherwise indicated:

- PS 126 Jacob August Riis
- PS 140 Nathan Straus
- PS 184 Shuang Wen
- PS 188 The Island School – Due to the large number of homeless students (which make up nearly half of the student population), the rosters often change and students are often absent.
- East Village Community School (grades PK–5)

The following public middle and high schools are located on the Lower East Side:

- Orchard Collegiate Academy (grades 9–12)
- School for Global Leaders (grades 6–8)
- University Neighborhood Middle School (grades 5–8)
- University Neighborhood High School (grades 9-12)

The Lower East Side Preparatory High School (LESPH) and Emma Lazarus High School (ELHS) are second-chance schools that enable students, aged 17–21, to obtain their high school diplomas. LESPH is a bilingual Chinese-English school with a high proportion of Asian students. ELHS' instructional model is English-immersion with an ethnically diverse student body.

The Seward Park Campus comprises five schools with an average graduation rate of about 80%. The original school in the building was opened 1929 and closed 2006.

=== Libraries ===
The New York Public Library (NYPL) operates two branches on the Lower East Side. The Seward Park branch is located at 4192 East Broadway. It was founded by the Aguilar Free Library Society in 1886, and the current three-story Carnegie library building was opened in 1909 and renovated in 2004. The Hamilton Fish Park branch is located at 415 East Houston Street. It was originally built as a Carnegie library in 1909, but was torn down when Houston Street was expanded; the current one-story structure was completed in 1960.

== Parks ==
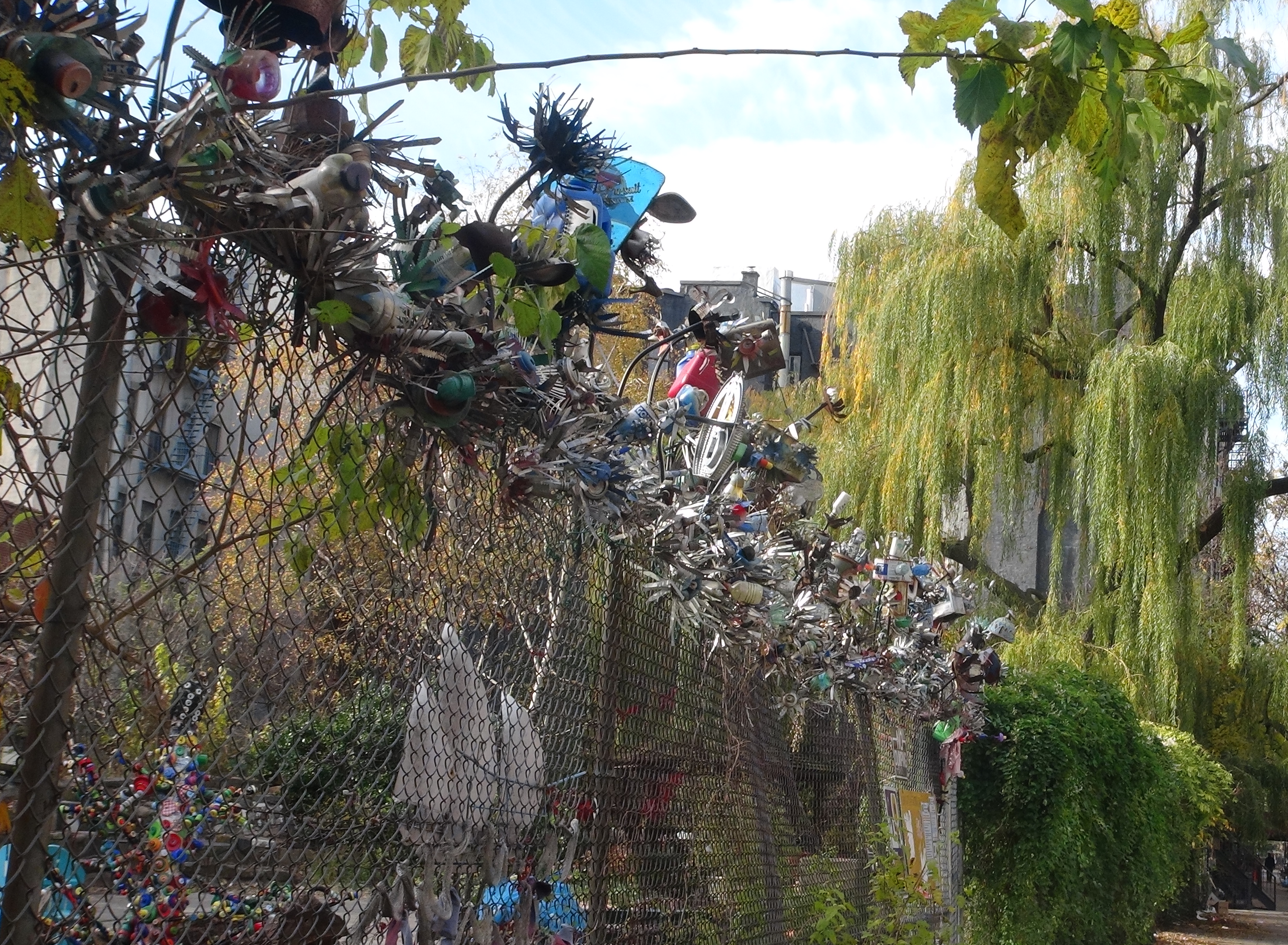
View of La Plaza Cultural from East 9th Street

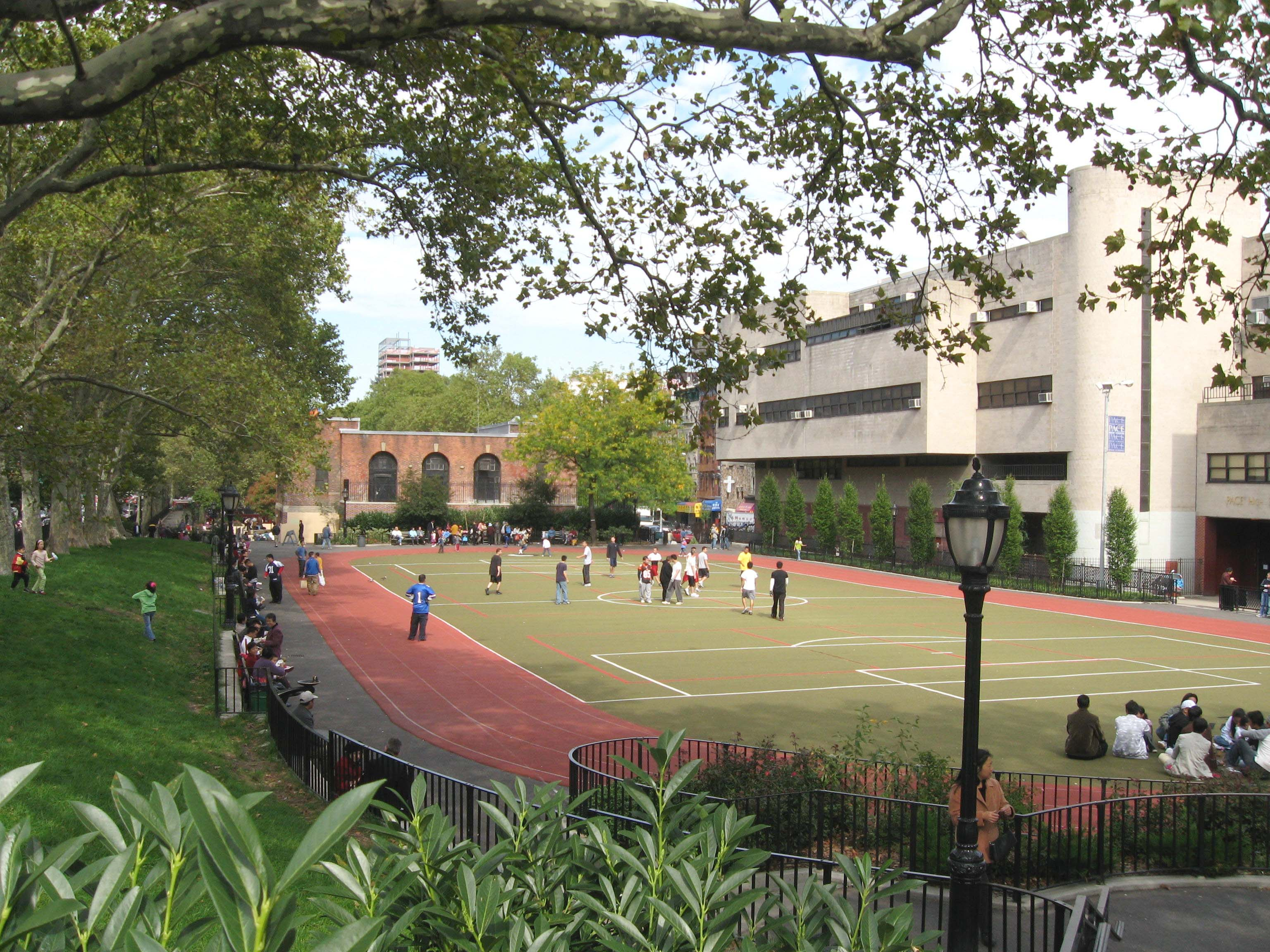
South end soccer field of Sara D. Roosevelt Park

The Lower East Side is home to private parks, such as La Plaza Cultural. There are also several public parks in the area, including Sara D. Roosevelt Park between Chrystie and Forsyth Streets from Houston to Canal Streets, as well as Seward Park on Essex Street between Hester Street and East Broadway.

The East River shorefront contains the John V. Lindsay East River Park, a public park running between East 12th Street in the East Village and Montgomery Street on the Lower East Side. Planned for the waterfront is Pier 42, the first section of which is scheduled to open in 2021.

== Transportation ==
There are multiple New York City Subway stations in the neighborhood, including Grand Street (B and D trains), Bowery (J and Z trains), Second Avenue (F and <F> trains), Delancey Street–Essex Street (F, <F>, J, M, and Z trains), and East Broadway (F and <F> trains). New York City Bus routes include M9, M14A SBS, M14D SBS, M15, M15 SBS, M21, M22, M103 and B39.

The Williamsburg Bridge and Manhattan Bridge connect the Lower East Side to Brooklyn. The FDR Drive is on the neighborhood's south and east ends.

As of 2018, thirty-seven percent of roads on the Lower East Side have bike lanes. Bike lanes are present on Allen, Chrystie, Clinton, Delancey, Grand, Houston, Montgomery, Madison, Rivington, Stanton, and Suffolk Streets; Bowery, East Broadway, and FDR Drive; the Williamsburg and Manhattan bridges; and the East River Greenway.

The Lower East Side is served by NYC Ferry's South Brooklyn route, which stops at Corlears Hook in the East River Park. Service to the ferry landing started operating on August 29, 2018.

== In popular culture ==
Children's literature

- All-of-a-Kind Family, a five-book series by Sydney Taylor first published from 1951 to 1978
- The House on the Roof; A Sukkot Story by David A. Adler
- Rebecca Rubin, a character in the American Girl doll and book series, is a Jewish girl growing up in an immigrant family in 1914.

History books

- The Spirit of the Ghetto: Studies of the Jewish Quarter in New York is a 1902 book by Hutchins Hapgood

Novels

- Yekl: A Tale of the New York Ghetto by Abraham Cahan. The film Hester Street is based on the book.
- Salome of the Tenements by Anzia Yezierska, published in 1923
- Bread Givers by Anzia Yezierska
- Jews without Money by Mike Gold
- Call It Sleep by Henry Roth
- The Hoods by Harry Grey. The film Once Upon a Time in America is based on the book.
- Ragtime by E. L. Doctorow
- Low Life by Lucy Sante
- Lush Life by Richard Price
- Wonder by R.J. Palacio

Songs

- "Slum Goddess" by The Fugs
- "Ballad Of The Lower East Side" by Michael Monroe
- "Beautiful Night" by B2ST
- "Clinton St Girl" by Wakey!Wakey!
- "Down on the Lower East Side" by Justin Townes Earle
- "East Side Beat" by The Toasters
- "East Side Story" by Emily King
- "For My Family" by Agnostic Front
- "Heavy Metal Lover" by Lady Gaga
- "In the Flesh" by Blondie
- "L.E.S. Artistes" by Santigold
- "L.E.S. Girl" by Madonna
- "L.E.S." by Childish Gambino (aka Donald Glover)
- "Living in L.E.S." by INDK
- "Lower East Side Crew" by Warzone
- "Lower East Side" by David Peel
- "The Luckiest Guy On The Lower East Side" by The Magnetic Fields
- "Ludlow St" by Julian Casablancas
- "Ludlow Street" by Suzanne Vega
- "Marry the Night" by Lady Gaga
- "New York City Tonight" by GG Allin
- "She Took a Lot of Pills (And Died)" by Robbie Fulks
- "Southside" by Fun Lovin' Criminals
- "What's My Name?" by Rihanna ft. Drake
- "Veni Vidi Vici" by Madonna
- "canal street" by Sombr
- Motor-Cycle LP by Lotti Golden
- David Peel & the Lower East Side Band, an early punk band
- Gogol Bordello, a gypsy punk band from the area
- The Holy Modal Rounders, a freak-folk band in the 1960s
- Nausea, a crust punk band in the late 1980s and early 1990s

Plays

- Secret History of the Lower East Side by Alice Tuan
- Welcome to Arroyo's by Kristoffer Diaz

Films

- Alphabet City
- Batteries Not Included
- Beautiful Losers
- Before We Go
- Cloverfield
- The Cobbler
- The Corruptor
- Crossing Delancey
- Date Night
- Die Hard with a Vengeance
- Donnie Brasco
- Downtown 81
- Frogs for Snakes
- Gangs of New York
- The Girl Is in Trouble
- Hester Street
- His People
- I Am Legend
- The Italian
- Johnny Dangerously
- Lucky Number Slevin
- Married to the Mob
- Men in Black
- Mixed Blood
- The Naked City
- Nick and Norah's Infinite Playlist
- The Night They Raided Minsky's
- Once Upon a Time in America
- P.S. I Love You
- Raising Victor Vargas
- Rent
- Rhythm Thief
- Sex and the City
- Taxi Driver
- The Wolfpack
- When Harry Met Sally...

Television

- The Andy Milonakis Show
- Flight of the Conchords (TV series)
- Forever
- Gossip Girl
- How To Make It In America
- Mr. Robot
- Breadwinners parodies the Lower East Side as the "Lower Yeast Side".
- Master of None
- Moon Girl and Devil Dinosaur

Video games

- The Darkness
- Syphon Filter 2
- Grand Theft Auto IV

Music videos

- "Girls Just Want To Have Fun" by Cyndi Lauper
- "Can't Hold Us Down" by Christina Aguilera
- "I'll Be Loving You Forever" by New Kids On The Block
- "Darling It's True" by Locksley
- "It Ain't Hard to Tell" by Nas

== Notable residents ==
- Adrienne Bailon (born 1983), television personality, singer, and actress
- George Barris (1922–2016), photographer and photojournalist
- Sy Berger (1923–2014), baseball card designer with Topps
- Mark Bloch (born 1956), artist and writer
- Joseph B. Bloomingdale (1842–1904), businessman
- Lyman G. Bloomingdale (1841–1905), businessman and philanthropist
- Arlyne Brickman (1934–2020), mafia informant
- Lepke Buchalter (1897–1944), mobster and head of Murder, Inc.
- George Burns (1896–1996), comedian, actor, writer, and singer
- James Cagney (1899–1986), actor, dancer, and film director
- Sammy Cahn (1913–1993), lyricist, songwriter, and musician
- Michael Che (born 1983), stand-up comedian, actor, and writer
- Joshua Lionel Cowen (1877–1965), inventor
- Jimmy Durante (1893–1980), comedian, actor, singer, and pianist
- Monk Eastman (1875–1920), gangster
- Miriam Friedlander (1914–2009), politician
- Lady Gaga (born 1986), singer, songwriter, and actress
- John Garfield (1913–1952), actor
- Ben Gazzara (1930–2012), actor and director
- George Gershwin (1898–1937), composer and pianist
- Vincent Gigante (1928–2005), mobster
- Lotti Golden (born 1949), singer-songwriter, record producer, poet, and artist
- Marcus Goldman (1821–1904), investment banker, businessman, and financier
- Ralph Goldstein (1913–1997), Olympic épée fencer
- Ruby Goldstein (1907–1984), professional boxer and prize fight referee
- Samuel Gompers (1850–1924), cigar maker and labor union leader
- David Gordon (1936–2022), post-modern dancer, choreographer, and theatrical director
- Stephen Grammauta (1916–2016), mobster
- Rocky Graziano (1919–1990), professional boxer and actor
- Samuel Greenberg (1893–1917), poet and artist
- David Greenglass (1922–2014), machinist and atomic spy
- Sally Gross (1933–2015), dancer and choreographer
- Luis Guzmán (born 1956), actor
- Maggie Gyllenhaal (born 1977), actress and filmmaker
- Yip Harburg (1896–1981), song lyricist and librettist
- Lazarus Joseph (1891–1966), lawyer and politician
- Jane Katz (born 1943), educator, author, and Olympic swimmer
- Jack Kirby (1917–1994), comic book artist, writer, and editor
- LA II (born 1967), graffiti and visual artist
- Fiorello LaGuardia (1882–1947), attorney and politician
- Meyer Lansky (1902–1983), organized crime figure
- Emanuel Lehman (1827–1907), businessman and banker
- Henry Lehman (1822–1855), businessman and banker
- Mayer Lehman (1830–1897), businessman, banker, and philanthropist
- Saul Leiter (1923–2013), photographer and painter
- Melissa Leo (born 1960), actress
- John Locke (1847–1889), Irish nationalist and poet
- Lucky Luciano (1897–1962), gangster
- Sidney Lumet (1924–2011), film director
- Madonna (born 1958), singer, songwriter, and actress
- Joseph Mankiewicz (1909–1993), film director, screenwriter, and producer
- Jackie Mason (1931–2021), stand-up comedian and actor
- Walter Matthau (1920–2000), actor, comedian, and film director
- Julia Migenes (born 1949), soprano
- Zero Mostel (1915–1977), actor, comedian, and singer
- Jim Neu (1943–2010), playwright
- Mikhail Odnoralov (1944–2016), artist
- Charlie Parker (1920–1955), jazz saxophonist, band leader, and composer
- Genesis P-Orridge (1950–2020), singer-songwriter, musician, poet, performance artist, visual artist, and occultist
- Anthony Provenzano (1917–1988), mobster
- Lee Quiñones (born 1960), artist and actor
- Lou Reed (1942–2013), musician, songwriter, and poet
- Edward G. Robinson (1893–1973), actor
- Sonny Rollins (born 1930), jazz tenor saxophonist
- Joseph Seligman (1819–1880), banker and businessman
- Bugsy Siegel (1906–1947), mobster
- Sheldon Silver (1944–2022), politician and attorney
- Al Singer (1909–1961), professional boxer
- Mose Solomon (1900–1966), professional baseball player
- Sombr (born 2005), singer, songwriter, and record producer
- David South, musician and filmmaker
- John Spacely (died 1993), musician, actor, and nightlife personality
- Ysanne Spevack (born 1972), composer, conductor, and arranger; changed her name in 2018 to Meena Ysanne
- Johnny Thunders (1952–1991), guitarist, singer, and songwriter
- Rachel Trachtenburg (born 1993), musician and singer
- Luther Vandross (1951–2005), singer, songwriter, and record producer
- B. D. Wong (born 1960), actor
- Christopher Woodrow (born 1977), entrepreneur, financier, and movie producer

== See also ==
- Alife Rivington Club
- Cooperative Village
- Grand Street Settlement
- East Side (Manhattan)
- East Side Hebrew Institute (ESHI)
- East Village/Lower East Side Historic District
- First Houses
- Henry Street Settlement
- Lower East Side Conservancy
- Lower East Side History Project
- Lower East Side Tenement Museum
- Moshe Feinstein
- Museum of Reclaimed Urban Space
- Ray's Candy Store
- TEATRO SEA
- Tompkins Square Park
- University Settlement House
