= Kossar's Bialys =

Bakery in New York City

Kossar's Bagels & Bialys
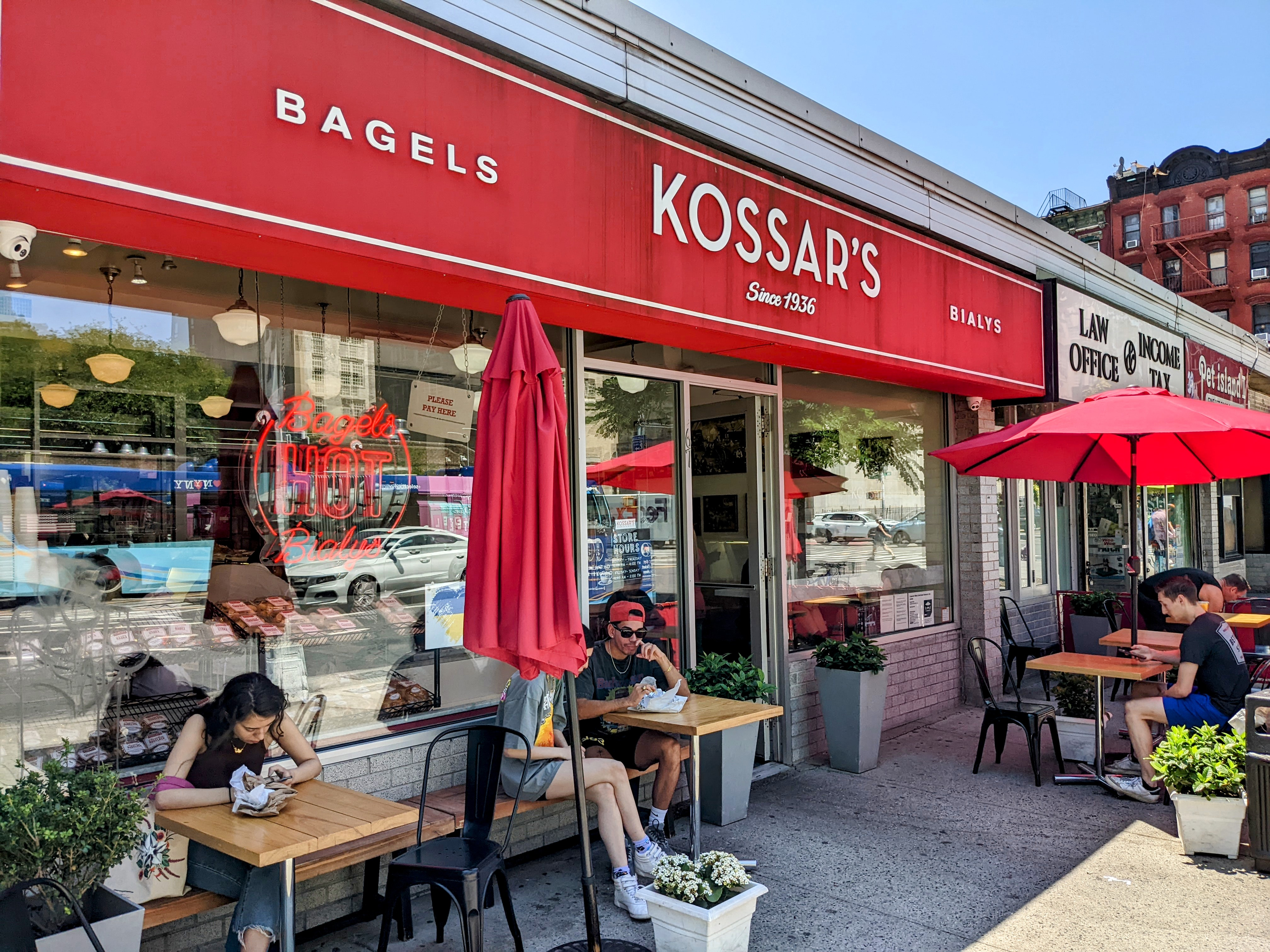
- Kossar's Bialys
- Interactive map of Kossar's Bagels & Bialys

Restaurant information
- Established: 1936
- Food type: Bakery
- Location: 367 Grand Street (and Essex Street), Lower East Side, Manhattan, New York City, New York, 10002, United States
- Coordinates: 40.716446°N 73.988792°W
- Website: http://www.kossars.com

Kossar's Bialys (Kossar's Bialystoker Kuchen Bakery) located at 367 Grand Street (and Essex Street), on the Lower East Side of Manhattan in New York City, is the oldest bialy bakery in the United States.

== Background ==
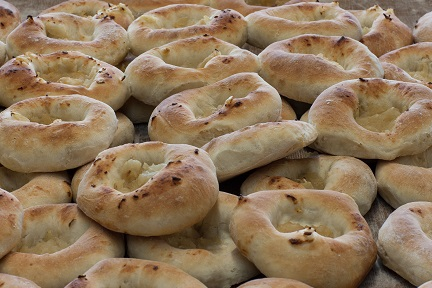
Kossar's bialys hot out of the oven

The bialy gets its name from the "Bialystoker Kuchen" of Białystok, in present-day Poland. Polish Jewish bakers who arrived in New York City in the late 19th century and early 20th century made an industry out of their recipe for the mainstay bread rolls baked in every household.

== History ==
Kossar's Bialys, originally known as Mirsky and Kossar's when Isadore Mirsky and Morris Kossar founded it in 1936, is one of the few remnants of what was once its own industry in New York City with its own union association and an owners' alliance known the Bialy Bakers Association, Inc.

Originally located at 145 Clinton Street in Manhattan's Lower East Side, Kossar's Bialys moved to its current location at Grand and Essex Streets in the early 1960s after a union dispute and subsequent fire destroyed the building.

Juda Engelmayer, Debra Engelmayer, Daniel Cohen, and Malki Cohen purchased the bakery from Morris Kossar's son-in-law and daughter, Daniel and Gloria Kossar Scheinin in 1998.

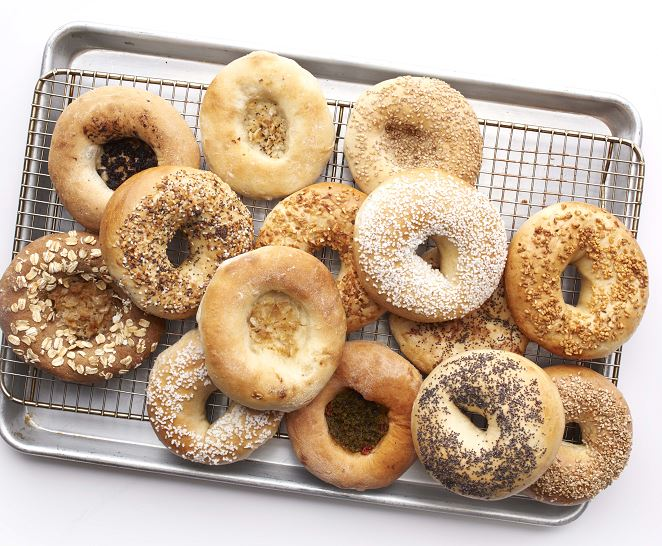
Kossar's Bagels and Bialys

In 2013, Evan Giniger and David Zablocki purchased the bakery from the Engelmayers and Cohens. After the sale, the new owners made a number of upgrades and changes to the store, including expanding the menu and making the decision to no longer operate as a kosher establishment.

Kossar's has a history of employing many female cashiers from the Philippines and employees from other countries as well. Many of these employees worked at the bakery for decades and still work at the bakery.

== Expansion ==
Beginning in 2022, Kossar's Bagels & Bialys expanded beyond its original Lower East Side location, opening four additional storefronts across Manhattan as of July 2025.

- Hudson Yards (530 West 30th Street) – Opened July 2022
- Upper East Side (1409 York Avenue) – Opened March 1, 2023
- Upper West Side (270 West 72nd Street) – Opened May 9, 2024
- West End Avenue (35 West End Avenue) – Opened March 2025

== In popular culture ==
Kossar's Bialys was the starting point for former New York Times food critic Mimi Sheraton's research for her 2002 book, The Bialy Eaters: The Story of a Bread and a Lost World.

Kossar's Bialys is on the Lower East Side and Lower Manhattan tour circuit.

== See also ==
- Bialystoker Synagogue
- List of Ashkenazi Jewish restaurants
