= Bialystoker Synagogue =

Synagogue in Manhattan, New York

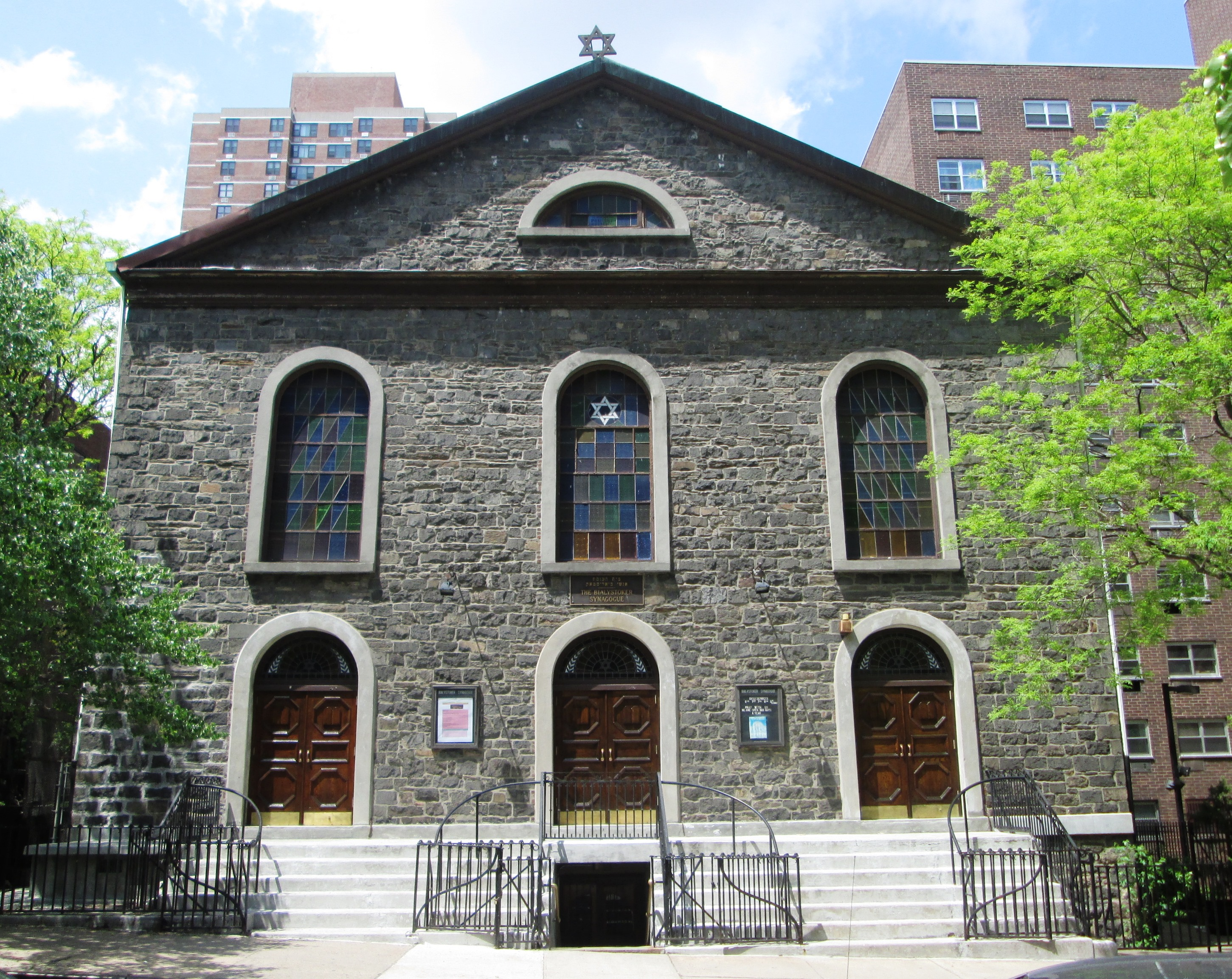
- Bialystoker Synagogue in 2013

- Location in Lower Manhattan

Religion
- Affiliation: Orthodox Judaism
- Ecclesiastical or organizational status: Church (1826 – 1905); Synagogue (since 1905)
- Leadership: Rabbi Menachem Tuchman
- Status: Active

Location
- Location: 7-13 Bialystoker Place
- Municipality: Manhattan, New York City, New York
- Country: United States
- Interactive map of Bialystoker Synagogue
- Coordinates: 40°42′56″N 73°59′1″W

Architecture
- Type: Church
- Style: Federal
- Established: 1865 (as a congregation)
- Completed: 1826 (as a church); 1905 (as a synagogue)
- Materials: Manhattan schist

Website
- bialystoker.org
- Bialystoker Synagogue (Willett Street Methodist Episcopal Church)
- U.S. National Register of Historic Places
- New York State Register of Historic Places
- New York City Landmark
- NRHP reference No.: 72000861
- NYSRHP No.: 06101.000440

Significant dates
- Added to NRHP: April 26, 1972
- Designated NYSRHP: June 23, 1980
- Designated NYCL: April 19, 1966

The Bialystoker Synagogue is an Orthodox Jewish synagogue at 7–11 Bialystoker Place (also known as Willett Street) on the Lower East Side of Manhattan in New York City, New York, United States. The building was constructed in 1826 as the Willett Street Methodist Episcopal Church; the synagogue purchased the building in 1905.

The synagogue was designated a New York City Landmark in 1966. It is one of only four early-19th century fieldstone religious buildings surviving from the late Federal period in Lower Manhattan, and is the oldest building used as a synagogue in New York City.

== Congregation ==
The Bialystoker Synagogue was first organized in 1865 on Manhattan's Lower East Side as the Chevra Anshei Chesed of Bialystok, founded by a group of Jews who came from the town of Białystok, at that time located in the Russian Empire, but now in Poland. The congregation was begun in a building on Hester Street, it later moved to Orchard Street, and ultimately to its present location 7–11 Bialystoker Place on the Lower East Side.

In order to accommodate the influx of new immigrants from that area of Poland, in 1905 the congregation merged with congregation Adas Yeshurun, also from Bialystok, and formed the Beth Hakneses Anshei Bialystok (The Bialystoker Synagogue). The newly formed congregation then purchased (and moved into) the Willett Street Methodist Episcopal Church at 7 Willet Street, which was later renamed Bialystoker Place. During the Great Depression a decision was made to beautify the main sanctuary, to provide a sense of hope and inspiration to the community.

The community today is the biggest synagogue on the Lower East Side with several daily minyanim. Rabbi Menachem Tuchman serves as the rabbi.

== Architecture ==
The fieldstone Methodist Episcopal Church building was built in 1826 with a simple pedimented roof and round arched windows. The building is made of Manhattan schist from a quarry on nearby Pitt Street. The exterior is marked by three windows over three doors framed with round arches, a low flight of brownstone steps, a low pitched pediment roof with a lunette window and a wooden cornice.

The elaborate Torah Ark is believed to have been carved in Bialystok and shipped to New York.

As the synagogue is home to an Orthodox Jewish congregation, a balcony section was constructed to accommodate female congregants. In the corner of the women's gallery a small hidden door in the wall leads to a ladder going up to an attic, lit by two windows. When the building was first opened, it was a rest stop for the Underground Railroad movement; runaway slaves found sanctuary in this attic.

When the air conditioning was updated in the 1990s, an issue arose concerning the possible construction of rooftop units because of the building's historical landmark status. Because of these concerns, the cooling units were installed on the side of the building.

The congregation restored the interior in 1988. It simultaneously renovated an adjacent former Hebrew school building, which became The Daniel Potkorony Building.

== Gallery ==
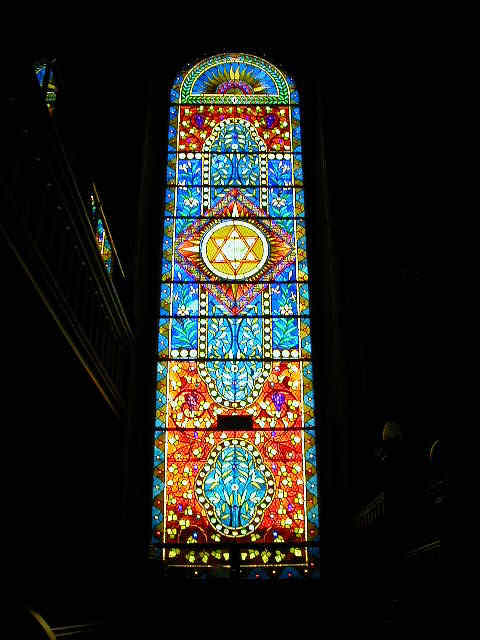
Restored stained glass window

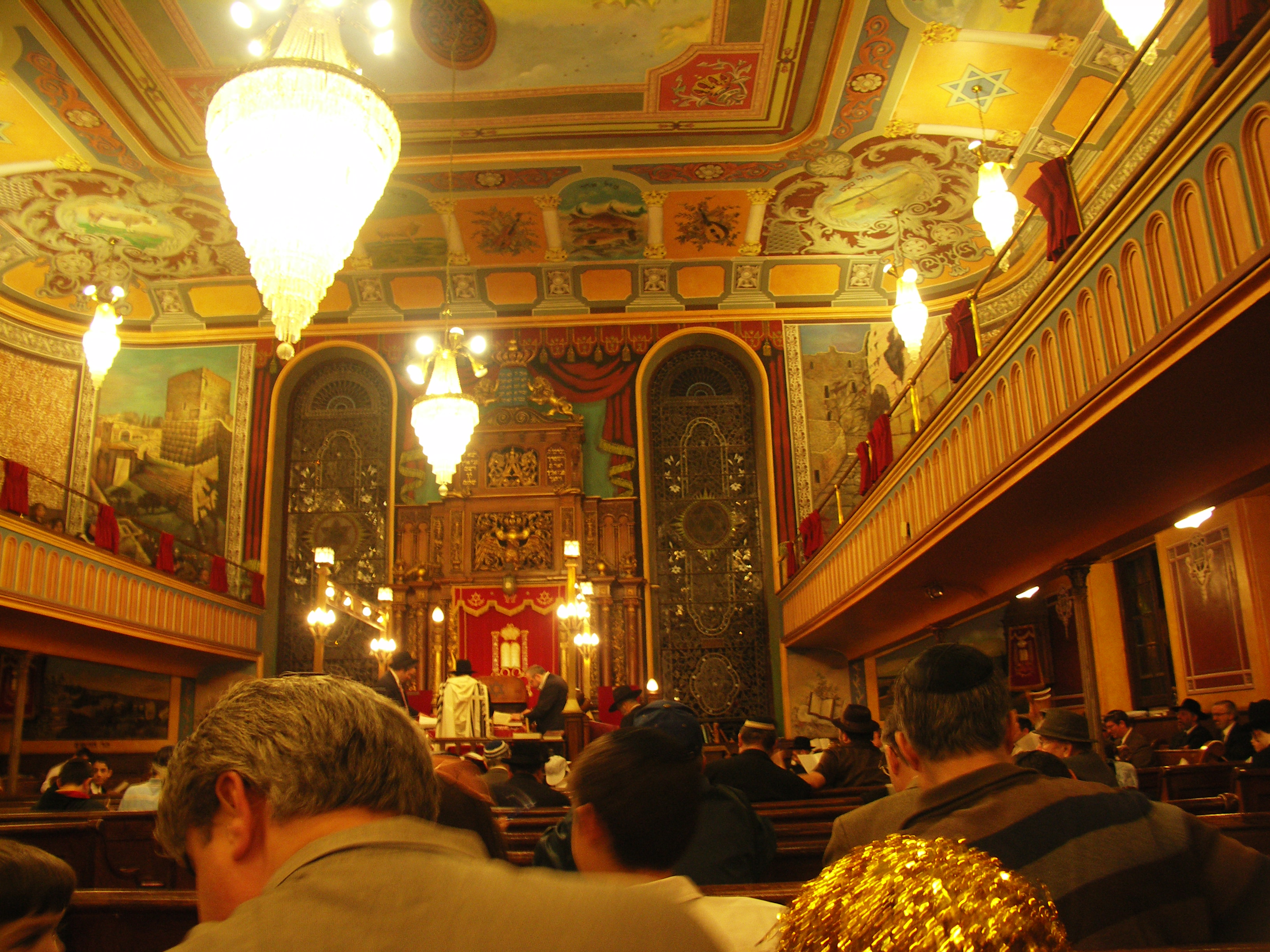
Reading the Book of Esther on Purim 2007 at Bialystoker

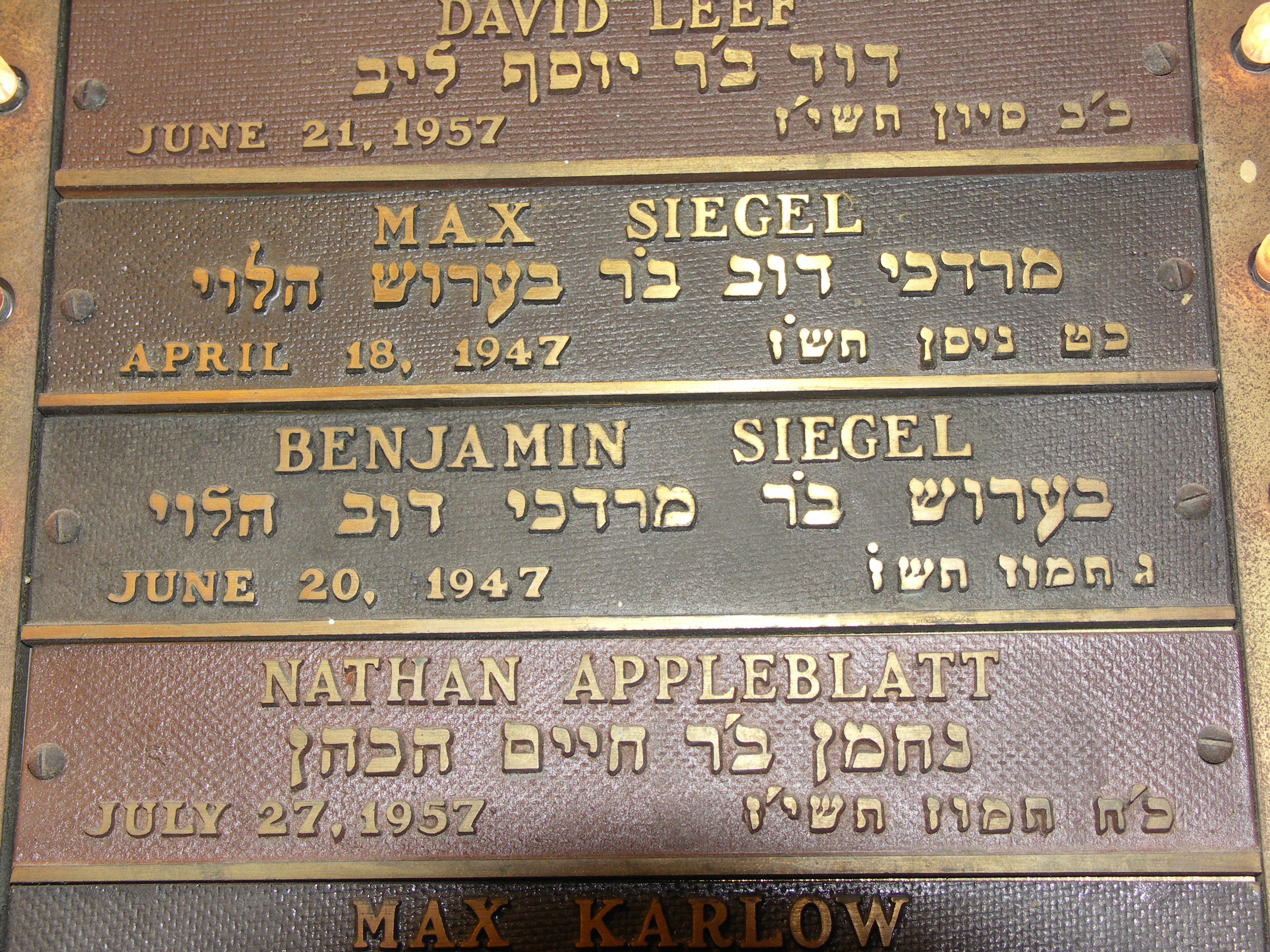
Bugsy Siegel's memorial plaque

== See also ==
- Bugsy Siegel Memorial
- Kossar's Bialystoker Kuchen Bakery – Bakery in New York City
- List of New York City Designated Landmarks in Manhattan below 14th Street
- National Register of Historic Places listings in Manhattan below 14th Street
