= Madelyn Wils =

American civic leader and nonprofit executive

Madelyn Wils is an American civic leader, nonprofit executive, and urban-development strategist. She is known for her role in the redevelopment of Lower Manhattan following the September 11 attacks and for serving as president and chief executive officer of the Hudson River Park Trust from 2011 to 2021. She has also served as president and CEO of the Tribeca Film Institute and as executive vice president at the New York City Economic Development Corporation.

== Early life and education ==
Wils grew up in Flushing, Queens, and attended Francis Lewis High School and Queens College. She later studied at the University of Arizona before returning to New York City. She moved to the Tribeca neighborhood of Lower Manhattan in the 1980s, where she became active in community affairs and neighborhood organizing.

== Early career ==
Before entering public life, Wils worked in media sales and television syndication. She later founded and ran her own production company.

From 1982 to 1984, she served as Executive Vice President at Post-Newsweek Television Inc. (now Graham Media Group), where she oversaw television production and distribution, including nationally syndicated programs like The Charlie Rose Show and Larry King Live.

In 1983, she founded Bread & Butter Television, a production company specializing in talk, magazine, and information programming for network and syndicated television. She served as its president until September 2001 and received awards from organizations including the National Academy of Television Arts and Sciences, the National Commission on Working Women, and American Women in Radio and Television.

== Civic career ==
=== Manhattan Community Board 1 ===
Wils joined Manhattan Community Board 1 (CB1) in 1987, representing neighborhoods including Tribeca, Battery Park City, South Street Seaport, and the Financial District. She chaired the Tribeca and Parks committees and worked with the New York City Department of City Planning on contextual zoning and historic landmark designations, including the creation of the Tribeca West Historic District.

In 2000, Wils was elected Chairperson of CB1. Under her tenure, the board worked on improving public spaces, community facilities, schools, parks, and housing initiatives.

=== September 11 and its aftermath ===
On September 11, 2001, Wils was in Lower Manhattan when the attacks on the World Trade Center occurred. As chair of CB1, she focused on the needs of residents and local businesses during the recovery period, which included advocating for tax relief for property owners, grants for small businesses, and improved cleanup of debris in residential areas near Ground Zero.

Wils served on the Ground Zero Elected Officials Task Force and was involved in independent environmental testing and advocacy related to residential air-quality concerns. During this period, she helped lead the creation of Millennium High School, described as the first general public high school in the district and the first school building to open in the area after the attacks.

=== Lower Manhattan Development Corporation ===
After September 11, Wils was appointed by Governor George Pataki to the Lower Manhattan Development Corporation (LMDC), where she served from 2001 to 2007. She served on the master planning committee for the World Trade Center site and chaired or co-chaired multiple advisory committees related to transportation, arts, and off-site planning. She has been described as the sole downtown resident on the LMDC board.

=== Tribeca Film Institute ===
From 2004 to 2006, Wils served as president and CEO of the Tribeca Film Institute. During her tenure, she expanded programming and increased public and private funding while broadening support for female and minority filmmakers.

=== New York City Economic Development Corporation ===
From 2007 to 2011, Wils served as Executive Vice President of Planning, Development, and Maritime at the New York City Economic Development Corporation (NYCEDC). She oversaw large-scale development projects across all five boroughs, including waterfront revitalization, ferry system planning, and redevelopment initiatives such as Coney Island, Hunters Point South, Essex Crossing, East River Esplanade, Seward Park, and Willets Point.

== Hudson River Park Trust ==
Wils was an early advocate for converting Manhattan's fenced-off West Side waterfront and abandoned piers into a public park, and served as the first chairperson of the park's Advisory Council. In 1998, she was appointed as one of the directors of the newly legislated Hudson River Park Trust, serving on its design committee.

In 2011, Wils was appointed president and CEO of the Hudson River Park Trust, the public-benefit corporation responsible for Hudson River Park. During her tenure, she oversaw more than $1 billion in design and construction initiatives, including Pier 26, Gansevoort Peninsula, Little Island at Pier 55, Chelsea Waterside Park, and Pier 97. She negotiated a partnership with the Diller–von Furstenberg Family Foundation that contributed over $225 million of the $260 million needed to build Little Island, which opened in 2021 and was named by Time magazine as one of the world's greatest places that year.

Operating revenues at the Trust increased significantly during her tenure, and the park expanded free and low-cost programming and sustainability initiatives. Wils also oversaw rebuilding of park infrastructure after Superstorm Sandy caused damage. The park received awards from the American Society of Landscape Architects and the Urban Land Institute.

Wils announced her resignation from the Trust in early 2021.

== Fifth Avenue Association ==
In 2022, Wils became president and CEO of the Fifth Avenue Association and co-chair of the Future of Fifth Steering Committee, a public-private initiative representing a comprehensive redesign of Fifth Avenue in Midtown Manhattan. The project aims to expand and green sidewalks, narrow the roadbed, improve pedestrian safety, and upgrade infrastructure such as lighting and seating along the corridor. The initiative has received over $400 million in city funding.

== Board memberships ==
Wils has served on the boards or advisory committees of numerous civic and cultural organizations, including the Alliance for Downtown New York, Lower Manhattan Cultural Council, Joyce Theater Foundation, The Gateway School of New York, Millennium High School, and the Empire State Stem Cell Board.

She chairs the building committee overseeing construction of a dance rehearsal studio for the Joyce Theater on Manhattan's Lower East Side.

== Awards and recognition ==
- 2011: David Rockefeller Downtown Leadership Award
- 2022: Center for Architecture Common Bond Honoree
- 2025: Parsons Table Award
- 2025: Manhattan Power 100 (City & State New York)
