= Essex Crossing =

Mixed-use development in Manhattan, New York

- Official rendering of Essex Crossing buildings at Essex and Delancey Streets
- Interactive map of Essex Crossing
- Address: Centered around Essex Street and Delancey Street, New York, NY 10002
- Coordinates: 40°43′05″N 73°59′17″W
- Status: Under construction
- Groundbreaking: 2015
- Estimated completion: 2024
- Website: http://essexcrossingnyc.com

Companies
- Developer: Delancey Street Associates
- Owner: Essex Crossing NYC
- Manager: Essex Crossing NYC

Technical details
- Cost: $1.1 billion

Essex Crossing is a mixed-use development in New York City's Lower East Side, at the intersection of Delancey Street and Essex Street just north of Seward Park. Essex Crossing will comprise nearly 2,000,000 sq ft (200,000 m^{2}) of space on 6 acres (2 1/2 ha) and will cost an estimated US$1.1 billion. Part of the existing Seward Park Urban Renewal Area (SPURA), the development will sit on a total of nine city blocks, most of them occupied by parking lots that replaced tenements razed in 1967.

Essex Crossing, approved on the site of the Seward Park Urban Renewal Area, was developed by Delancey Street Associates (a joint venture of L+M Development Partners, BFC Partners, and Taconic Investment Partners). SHoP Architects and Beyer Blinder Belle designed the master plan. The development has over 1,000 housing units, including affordable housing and senior housing; commercial venues such as a bowling alley, food hall, cinema, and museum; and 15,000 sq ft (1,400 m^{2}) of publicly accessible open space. The plan was presented to the public in September 2013 by then-Mayor Michael Bloomberg, as a compromise solution after decades of political disagreements over the site.

Construction on the project began in 2015, and the first phase of the project was completed in 2018.

== Context ==
=== Seward Park Urban Renewal Area ===
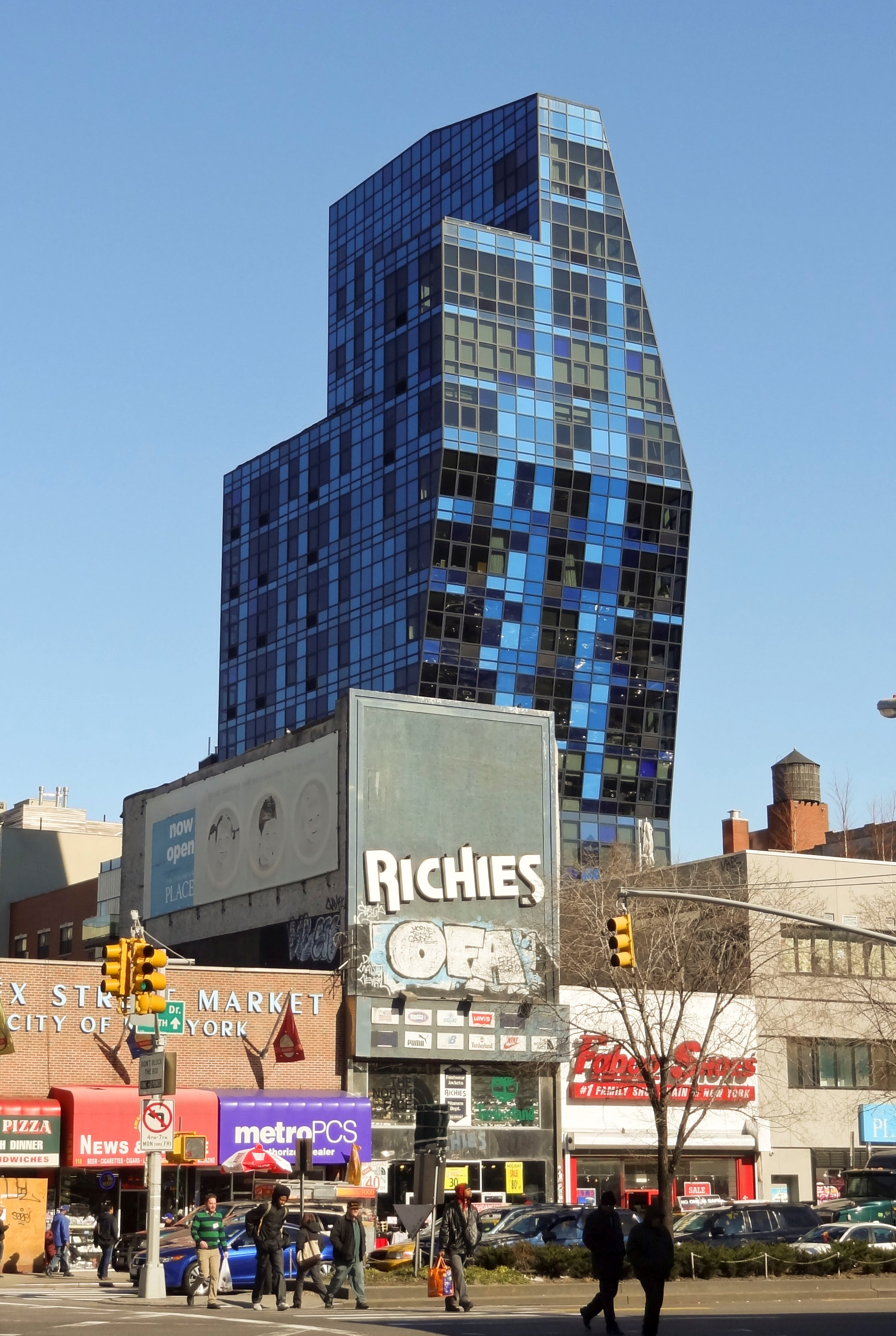
Site of the Essex Crossing, with the Blue Tower in the background, Essex Street Market to the left, and the intersection of Essex and Delancey streets in the foreground. (Photo from September 2013)

Historically, the Lower East Side was an immigrant neighborhood, including Germans, Irish, Italians, and Hispanics; Essex Crossing was envisioned during the neighborhood's period of gentrification. The surrounding portion of the Lower East Side has been proposed for development since the 1950s. The region later became the Seward Park Urban Renewal Area (SPURA), which covered five vacant plots of land acquired as part of a 1965 urban renewal plan, near Delancey and Grand streets. These sites were originally part of the broader Seward Park Urban Renewal Area, a federal program designed to tear down several tenements to develop low-income housing, called the Cooperative Village. Some original SPURA land was eventually developed, but five lots remain vacant to this day. SPURA was the largest tract of undeveloped New York City-owned land in Manhattan south of 96th Street, but debate over what would be the "appropriate redevelopment" of SPURA had stalled the process and kept it undeveloped.

In 1967, New York City leveled 20 acres on the southern side of Delancey Street and removed more than 1,800 low-income, largely Puerto Rican families, with a promise that they would return to new low-income apartments when they were built. However, political corruption abounded, and the new apartments were never built. The competing forces within the neighborhood debated whether the SPURA area should be used to develop affordable housing within Manhattan Community Board 3; or be developed as mixed-use – low- and middle-income as well as commercial; or whether it should be all large commercial retail use. During the Koch administration that ended in 1989, the city contracted with Sam LeFrak to build, but massive divided opposition caused it to be withdrawn.

In January and February 2011, the local community board took the issue of SPURA's development up and came to a community consensus that the area will be built to accommodate mixed use of low-income housing, commercial properties/retail spaces, and market-value homes. The Board, community and city planners and public officials were to finalize the plans for development. On October 11, 2012, the New York City Council approved the project, then still referred to as SPURA, in a unanimous vote. On September 18, 2013, the then Mayor Michael Bloomberg unveiled a definite plan for the Essex Crossing project. Delancey Street Associates—composed of L+M Development Partners, BFC Partners, and Taconic Investment Partners—were selected develop the site. The consortium was required to develop at least 1,000 apartments, including at least 500 affordable housing units, and they were required to set aside some units for families displaced by SPURA.

=== Construction ===
The first phase of Essex Crossing was to include 556 residential units, in addition to commercial and retail spaces such as a bowling alley, museum, and cinema. Four parcels, known as sites 1, 2, 5, and 6, were designated for development in the first phase. In June 2014, demolition of structures in the area commenced making way for the development. On August 2, 2014, it was revealed that a municipal parking lot at Broome and Essex streets would be closed for soil testing and planning of the future Warhol museum. Groundbreaking for the crossing was said to come as early as spring 2015, though a definite groundbreaking timeline had not been published. Another parking lot was closed on December 31, this time a private one on Suffolk Street. Detailed plans for the first phase of construction were announced in January 2015, and the Essex Street Market building south of Delancey Street was demolished that March.

Delancey Street Associates obtained $250 million in construction loans in July 2015, allowing work to begin on the first phase of the project the same month. That December, Delancey Street Associates obtained a further $79.5 million loan to develop Site 6 and a $95 million loan for Site 1. An affordable housing lottery for the first building, 242 Broome Street, was launched in 2016, followed by lotteries for the Frances Goldin Senior Apartments and The Essex the next year. The final first-phase building, The Essex, topped out in October 2017. The housing lotteries saw high demand; one of the lotteries attracted 60,000 applications for 99 units, while another lottery attracted 93,000 applications for 104 apartments. The first residents began moving into the development in November 2017, The Frances Goldin Senior Apartments, which formally opened in January 2018, was the first building in the development to be completed, and the first phase's other three buildings opened over the subsequent months.

Delancey Street Associates announced plans in February 2017 to increase the number of affordable and market-rate apartments at Essex Crossing, and it presented renderings of sites 3 and 4 to the public later that year. A 15,000-square-foot (1,400 m^{2}) public park designed by West 8 was completed in June 2019, and a lottery for 140 Essex Street opened that month. By then, one report estimated that Essex Crossing accommodated half a million daily visitors, about the same number as in the much larger Hudson Yards development on Manhattan's West Side. The housing lottery for the Artisan at 180 Broome Street was launched in March 2020, and leasing at that building commenced that August. Verizon leased office space at the development in 2021 but never moved in, instead subleasing it.

The developers refinanced the development in 2022 with a $466 million loan. In 2024, Taconic sold 315,000 square feet (29,300 m^{2}) of office space at 180 Broome Street and 202 Broome Street to Deutsche Bank. The next year, the Rosenkranz Foundation bought two of the office condos at 202 Broome Street. In addition, plans for a cultural venue known as Canyon were announced for Essex Crossing in mid-2025; the venue would open in 2026.

== Description ==
The development covers 6 acres (2.4 ha) and comprises the Essex Market, restaurants, office space, a movie theater, and a park. Essex Crossing, split among ten sequentially numbered lots, is on the east side of Essex Street between Stanton and Delancey streets (lots 8, 9, and 10); the municipal parking lot at Broome and Essex streets (lot 7); an area bounded by Attorney, Broome, Essex, and Delancey streets (lots 1, 2, 3, 4, and 6); and a block bounded by Grand, Clinton, Broome, and Suffolk streets (lot 5). Beyer Blinder Belle and SHoP Architects were responsible for Essex Crossing's master plan, which involved the development of 561 affordable apartments and 518 market rate apartments, for a total of 1,079 apartments. The area is served by the New York City Subway at Delancey Street–Essex Street, served by the F, <F>, J, M, and Z trains, in addition to local New York City Bus routes M9, M14A, and B39.

=== Existing ===
==== Residential ====
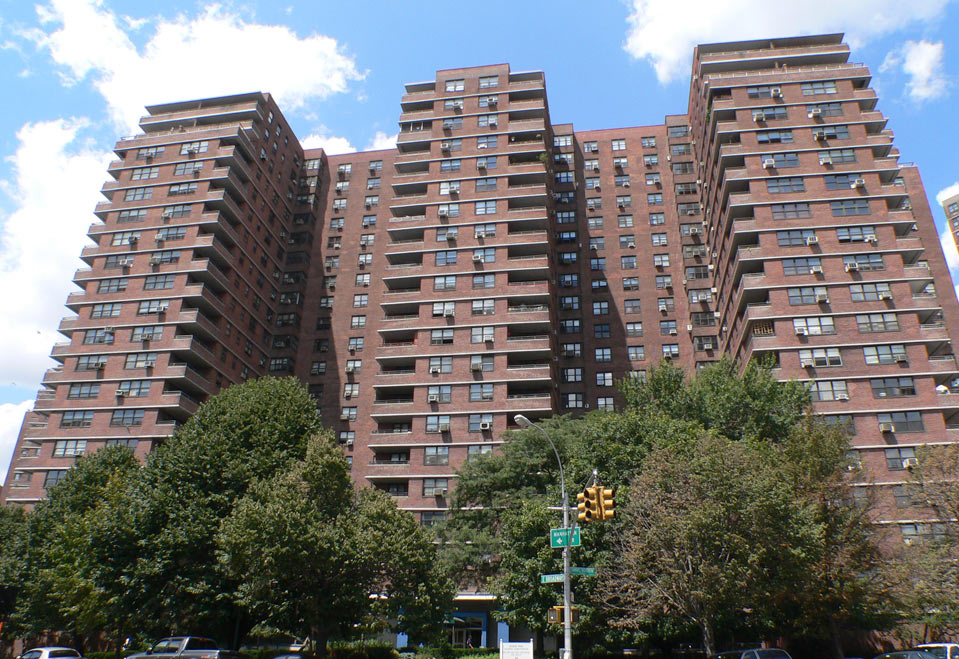
Existing Seward Park towers

There are both public housing and condominiums in the area. In the SPURA area, public housing is operated by the Seward Park Housing Corporation, part of the Cooperative Village, located in the triangle between Grand Street and East Broadway, and abuts Seward Park. The buildings, designed by Herman Jessor, were finished in 1959. Condominiums include the Blue Tower at 105 Norfolk Street, designed by Bernard Tschumi, opened in 2007 with 32 condominium apartments over 16 stories, a ground floor commercial space occupied by the Thierry Goldberg Gallery, and a roof terrace for residents on the third floor, using a common setup with commercial space at the ground floor with residential space above. The Blue Tower is not LEED certified. The tower had a characteristic slant that sets it apart from other buildings in the vicinity.

==== Essex Street Market ====
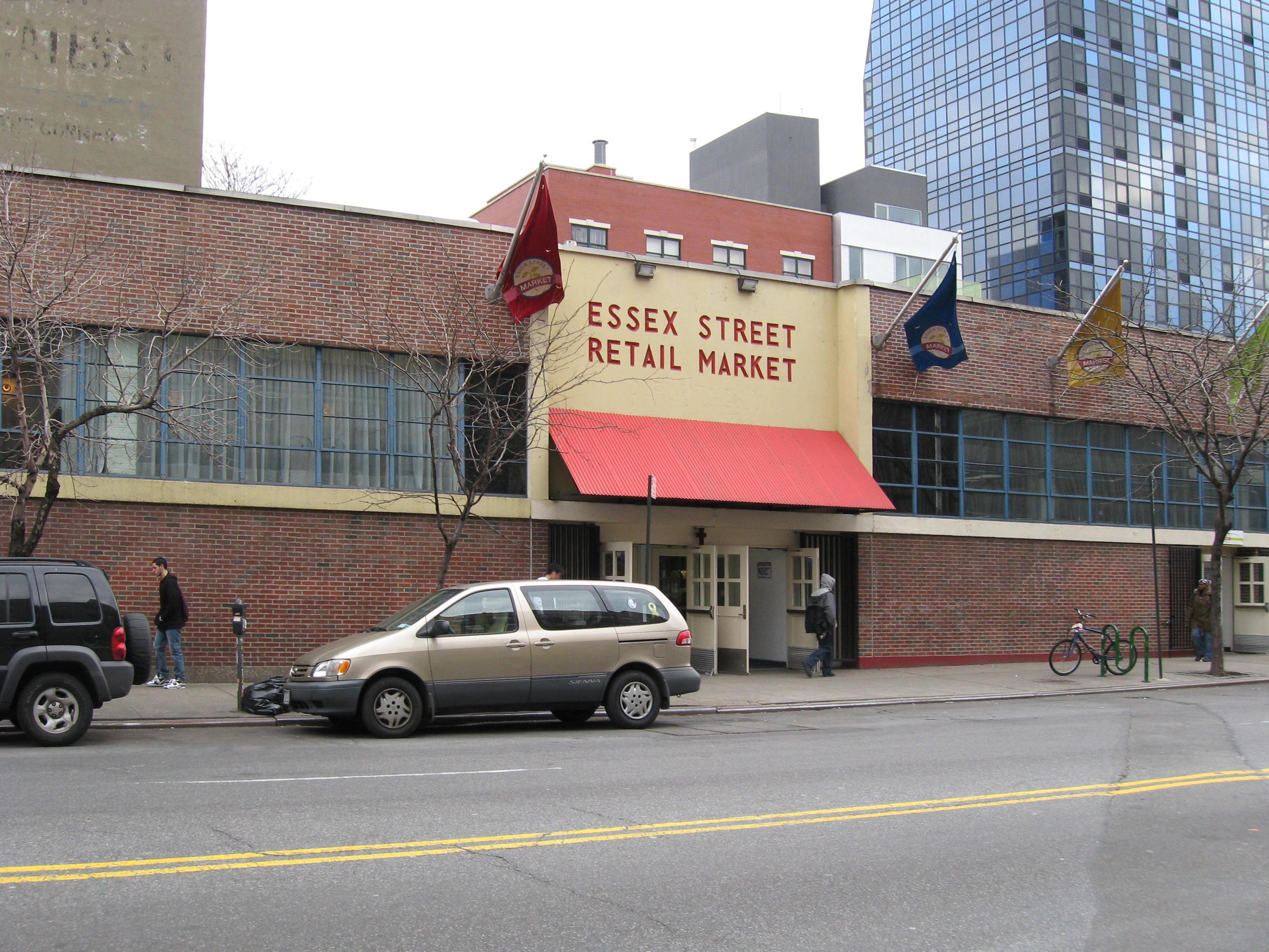
Essex Street Market, pre-reconstruction

The Essex Street Market is an indoor retail market, one of a number of such facilities built in the 1930s under the administration of Mayor Fiorello La Guardia, at 120 Essex Street, north of Delancey Street. The Essex Street Market, a group of markets constructed in the 1940s to reduce pushcart congestion on the narrow streets of the Lower East Side, is operated and managed by the New York City Economic Development Corporation (NYCEDC).

In September 2013, it was announced that the market would be integrated into the Essex Crossing. The new building, along Essex Street on the south side of Delancey, will have 39 stalls and two restaurants. It was originally planned to open in 2018, but was later pushed back to May 2019. Essex Market formerly had an additional food market known as the Market Line, which opened in November 2019 and closed in April 2025.

==== Essex Street municipal parking lot ====
An existing parking garage at 107 Essex Street, north of Delancey Street, is also being renovated as part of the redevelopment plan. Originally slated to be converted into housing under an idea by Councilwoman Margaret Chin, it was dropped from the project and later put back on.

=== Parkland ===
Part of the development includes a new public park on Broome Street between Suffolk and Clinton streets, spanning 15,000 ft^{2} (1,400 m^{2}). The park, which is part of the Seward Park Urban Renewal Area, will only be 35% planted, with open spaces, signage, bike racks, and skateboard-proof park benches. It will include a playground for toddlers, in anticipation of a new primary school nearby.

The large trolley terminal under Delancey and Essex streets sat unused for 60 years and became the location for a proposed park. The project, known as Lowline, was first proposed in 2011; the next year, it successfully raised over $150,000 from 3,300 backers on Kickstarter to create a full-scale exhibition of the solar lighting technology. If completed, it would have been within the Essex Crossing development, though the project was indefinitely postponed in February 2020 due to a lack of funding and was considered in the planning stages as of 2021. The Market Line space occupies part of where Lowline was supposed to be built.

On the southern side of Delancey Street is the 15,000-square-foot (1,400 m^{2}) Park at Essex Crossing, designed by West 8. The park includes a playground, benches, and plantings that were once native to New York City.

=== New buildings ===
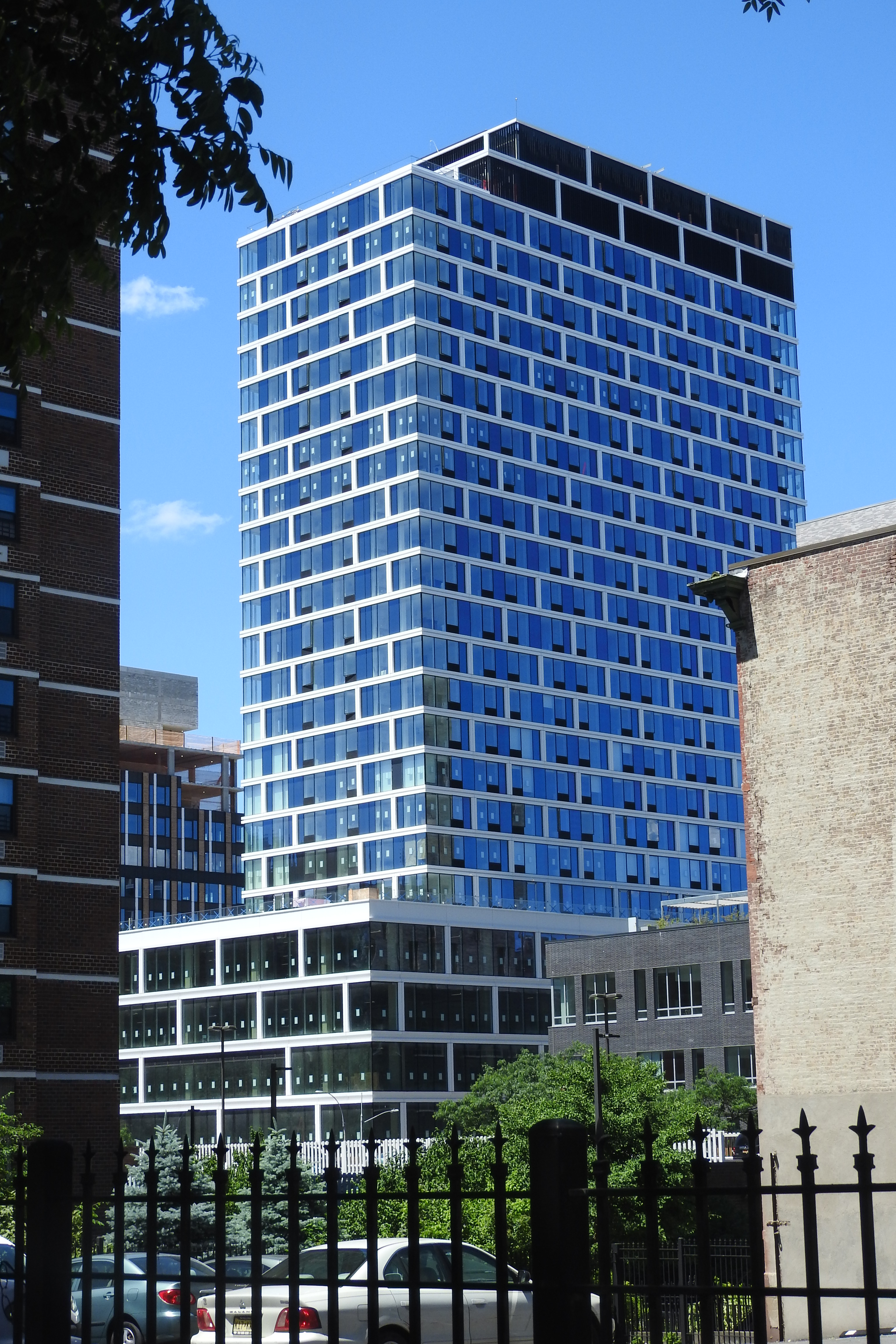
180 Broome Street

The development includes 1,079 apartments, over 50% of which are affordable housing. The first phase of Essex Crossing consists of four buildings. They have a combined 556 units, including 311 affordable units and 100 for senior residents. There will also be 155 condominiums, with 10 of them affordable.

==== Phase 1 ====
Phase 1 includes four buildings. Site 1, at 242 Broome Street, is a 14-story, 55-unit condominium building designed by SHoP Architects. Completed in 2018, it has a folded-aluminum facade with inverted setbacks. The building's lowest stories include the International Center of Photography and a bowling alley. The International Center of Photography signed a deal with Delancey Street Associates to house its museum and school there in 2017, and the new center opened in January 2020. Designed by architecture firm Gensler, the 40,000 sq ft (3,700 m^{2}) space has galleries, media labs, classrooms, darkrooms, shooting studios, a shop, café, research library and public event spaces. The Gutter, a 12-lane bowling alley in the basement, opened in October 2020.

At site 2 on 115 Delancey Street (125 Essex Street) is The Essex, a 24-story structure designed by Handel Architects, with 195 rental apartments In October 2014, a 65,000 sq ft (6,000 m^{2}) movie theater, with 14 screens, was announced. Located in the Essex building and operated by Regal Cinemas, it includes digital cinema projectors and recliners with padded footrests, among other amenities, as well as an RPX Regal Premium Experience auditorium and bar. Scheduled to begin construction in spring 2015 for completion by 2018, the theater opened on April 6, 2019. The sixth floor has a 0.25-acre (0.10 ha) urban farm that opened in August 2019.

Site 5 at 145 Clinton Street contains the Rollins, a 15-story structure designed by Beyer Blinder Belle, with 211 rental apartments. The building is named because it stands on a site where the saxophonist Sonny Rollins formerly lived. Trader Joe's opened a 30,000 ft^{2} (2,800 m^{2}) location on the first floor and basement of 145 Clinton Street, at the northwest corner with Grand Street, on October 19, 2018. The space on the building's second floor, immediately above Trader Joe's, is occupied by a 22,500 ft^{2} (2,090 m^{2}) Target store, which opened in August 2018.

Site 6 at 175 Delancey Street is occupied by The Goldin, a 14-story structure designed by Dattner. The building is also known as the Frances Goldin Senior Apartments and has 99 apartments, all of which are for senior citizens. There is also a senior center in the building, which serves residents of both The Goldin and 140 Essex Street.

One of these buildings will also include Canyon, a combined museum and performing-arts center designed by New Affiliates Architecture. Canyon would include 18,000 square feet (1,700 m^{2}) of exhibition space, a 300-seat performance hall, and a piazza.

==== Other structures ====
The second phase of the development includes three buildings:

- 140 Essex Street, an affordable housing development designed by Beyer Blinder Belle, has 92 apartments that are all reserved for senior citizens. It is the second building in Essex Crossing composed entirely of affordable units for the elderly, after The Goldin. There are also 9,600 square feet (890 m^{2}) of retail space at ground level.
- The Artisan, a 25-story tower at 180 Broome Street designed by Handel Architects, has 263 residential units. There are also 175,000 square feet (16,300 m^{2}) of office space, spread across four stories.
- 202 Broome Street, a 14-story tower designed by CetraRuddy, has 83 residential condominiums and 175,000 square feet (16,300 m^{2}) of office space, as well as an amenity garden. Part of the Market Line was also located within the building.

As of 2019, two additional buildings were planned as part of an unbuilt third phase:

- 116 Delancey Street, a nine-story building with retail and rental apartments
- 121 Stanton Street. a seven-story building with retail and condo apartments

=== Canceled projects ===
A 10,000 ft^{2} (900 m^{2}) annex to the main Pittsburgh museum, the Warhol building was scheduled to open by 2017. It would have taken up a parking lot as well as the 75 Essex Street building, a building at the corner of Broome and Essex streets that some locals are fighting to have landmarked. It was reported that Taconic offered 75 Essex Street's owners a huge sum to redevelop the building as part of the museum. Plans for this museum were canceled in March 2015.

In 2016, the Children's Museum of Manhattan announced plans to relocate to Essex Crossing. The museum planned to occupy 70,000 square feet (6,500 m^{2}), but these plans were canceled the next year due to financial and logistical conflicts.

== Reception ==
In 2019, New York Times architecture critic Michael Kimmelman described Essex Crossing as "the anti-Hudson Yards", saying that the developers had won over local residents and that "this may come as close as we can now get, in a political system obeisant to private enterprise, to balancing equity with gentrification".

=== Political issues ===
The SPURA area, now the Essex Crossing's site, was kept empty, except for parking lots, since 1967 due to suspected political alliances. In 1977, then-to-be-Assembly Speaker Sheldon Silver and Metropolitan Council on Jewish Poverty (Met Council) head William "Bill" Rapfogel accompanied then-mayor Edward Koch through the area, promising to turn some 20 acres (8.1 ha) of barren land on Delancey Street's south side into a never-delivered development that had displaced more than 1,800 residents a decade before.

Rapfogel and Silver were accused of promoting specific plans for favored developers, which would maintain the area's Jewish identity, at the expense of other communities. They opposed a 1970s plan for affordable housing, which would have changed the demographics of the neighborhood and brought in more Chinese and Hispanic residents. Silver instead proposed a shopping center with no housing for the site in the 1980s. In the 1990s, they proposed a “big box” store, like Costco, to be built by Bruce Ratner, a developer. Ratner hired Rapfogel's eldest son in 2007, and Silver employed Rapfogel's wife as his chief of staff. Ratner also helped raise $1 million for the Met Council.
