= Blue Tower =

The Blue Tower may be:

- HHHR Tower, a skyscraper in Dubai
- the Blåtårn in Copenhagen
- the former Blue Tower (Gorinchem) castle in Gorinchem
- the Blue Condominium in New York
- the Blue Tower of Dürnstein Abbey
