= Lowline (park) =

Park proposal in Manhattan, New York

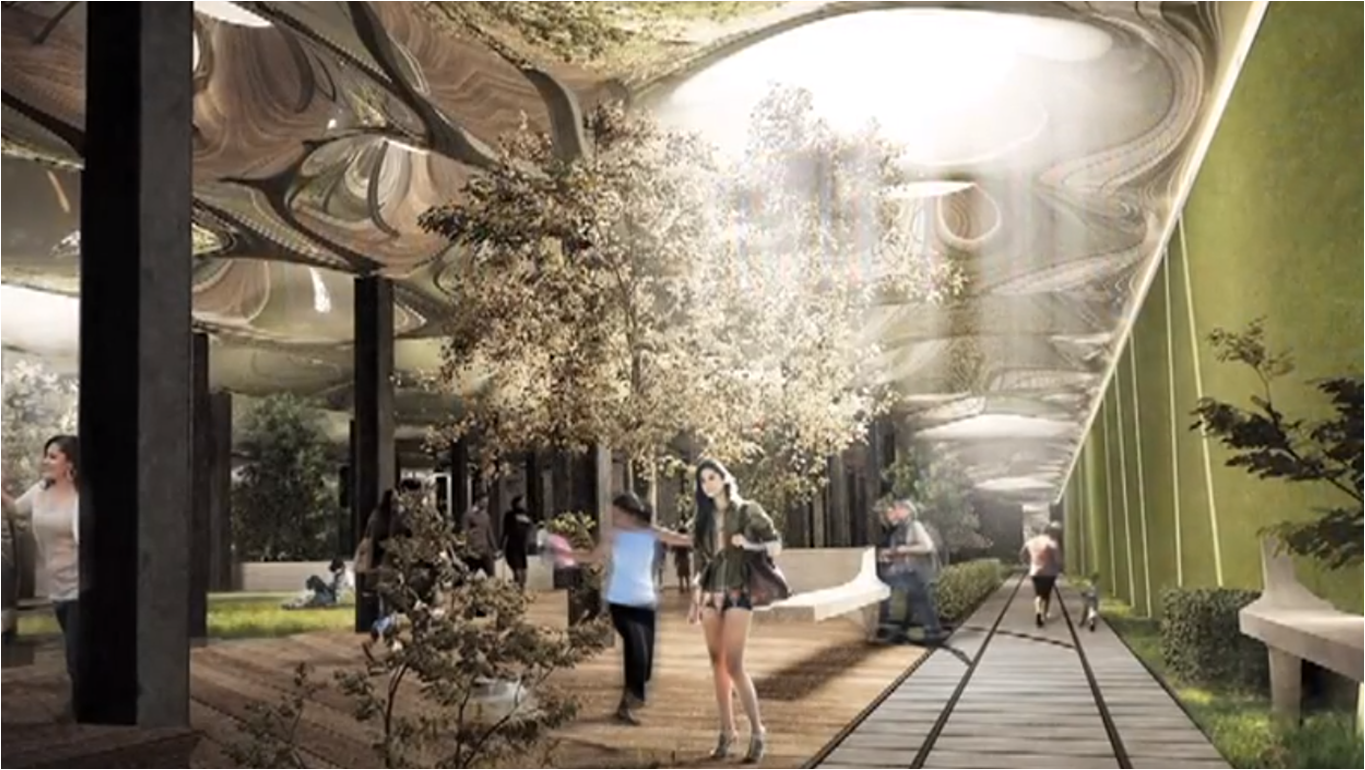
- Artist's concept of the proposed park design
- Interactive map of Lowline
- Type: Subterranean urban park
- Location: Manhattan, New York City (adjacent to Essex Street station)
- Coordinates: 40.717989°N 73.987025°W
- Status: On hold
- Website: http://thelowline.org/

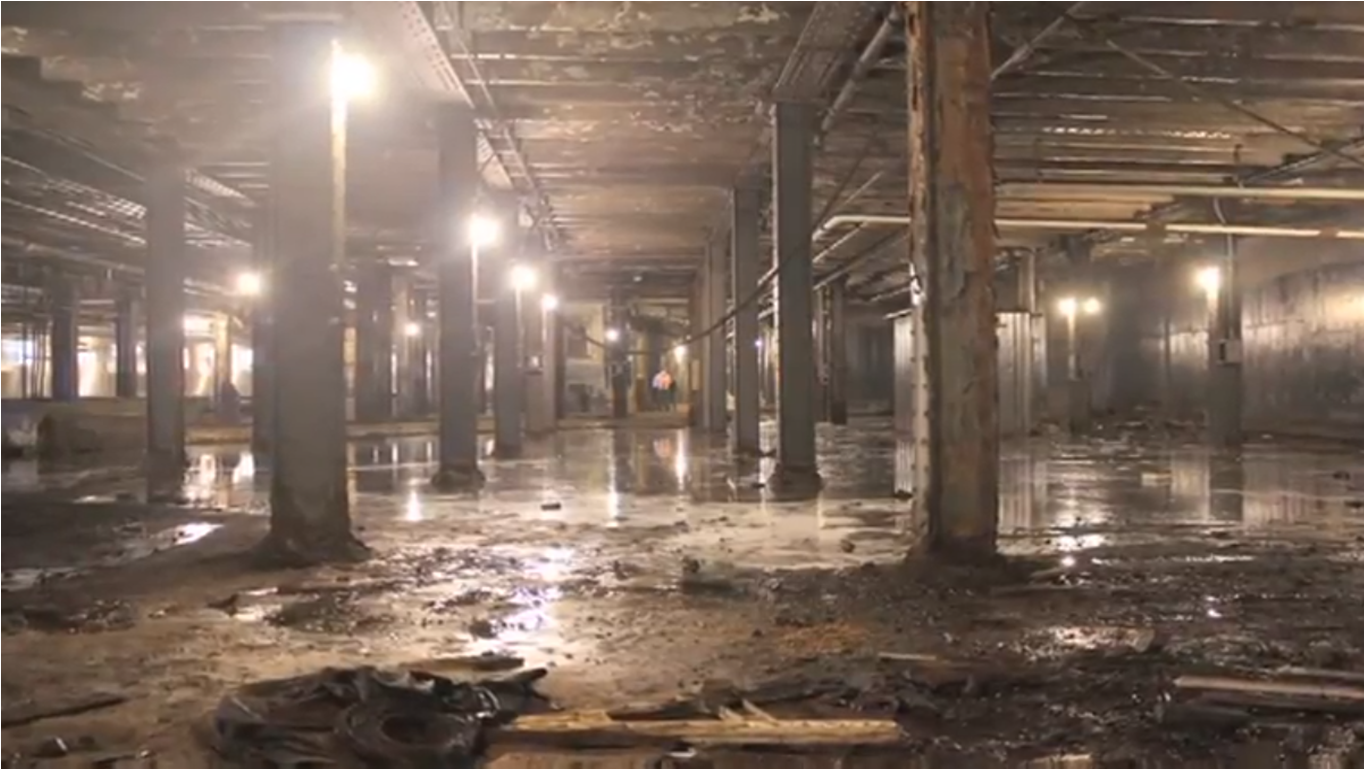
The abandoned Williamsburg Trolley Terminal space in 2012

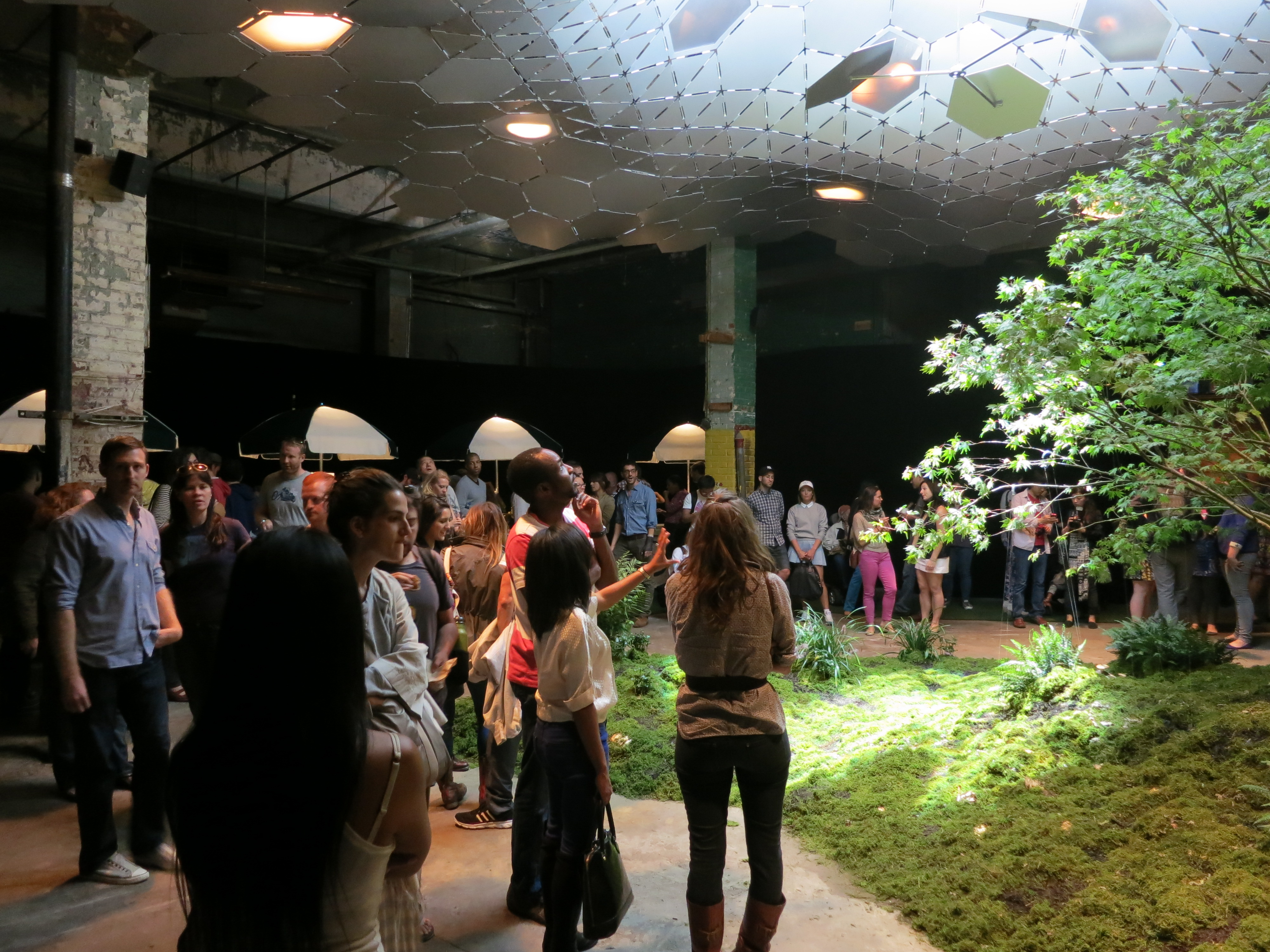
Lowline Tech Demo 2012

The Lowline, formerly known as the Delancey Underground, is a stalled construction project that would have become the world's first underground park in the New York City borough of Manhattan. It is located under the eastbound roadway of Delancey Street on the Lower East Side, in the former Williamsburg Bridge Trolley Terminal adjacent to the Essex Street station (J, M, and Z trains) and the Essex Crossing complex. Construction of the Lowline began in 2019, but was put on hold in 2020 due to lack of funds.

The name "Lowline" is an allusion to the High Line, an elevated park converted from an abandoned railway.

== Site description ==
Co-founders James Ramsey and Dan Barasch have suggested natural light would be directed below ground using a system that has been described in the proposed plan as "remote skylights", providing an area in which trees and grass could be grown beneath city streets. Light collectors would be placed at ground level or on surrounding rooftops, with suggested locations, including the median on Delancey Street. Artificial lighting would supplement the redirected sunlight on cloudy days and at night. The area, with ceilings 20 feet (6.1 m) high, extends three blocks east from Essex Street to Clinton Street and was used until 1948 as a station and balloon loop for streetcars crossing the Williamsburg Bridge to and from Brooklyn.

== History ==
The large trolley terminal that is the site has sat unused for more than 60 years. James Ramsey, an architectural designer who founded RAAD Studio, was inspired by the High Line to conceive of the project in 2009, and began working out the technological aspects of the park's development with Dan Barasch, who was becoming disillusioned with his work at Google. The project was first publicly proposed in 2011 and quickly generated widespread media attention.

In 2012, the project raised over $150,000 from 3,300 backers on Kickstarter to create a full-scale exhibition of the solar lighting technology. The project was named by Mashable as one of the top Kickstarter projects of that year. In September 2012 an installation was opened on the Lower East Side to promote the project; titled "Imagining the Lowline," it consisted of a 30-foot (9m) wide aluminum solar canopy distributing natural sunlight onto a live cultivated landscape "park." The exhibit saw over 11,000 visitors and featured design talks, school visits, weekend street fairs and a political event. The executive producer of the exhibit was Robyn Shapiro and the industrial designer was Ed Jacobs with support from Brandt Graves. Initial patent work in the associated technologies by David D. Winters, Winters Patent Law of Tennessee.

=== Support ===
The project was endorsed by politicians and organizations such as U.S. Senator Kirsten Gillibrand, former NY State Assembly Speaker Sheldon Silver, Manhattan Community Board 3, and the Lower East Side business improvement district. Barasch and Ramsey worked with HR&A Advisors and Arup to complete a feasibility study outlining the cost to build the park, long-term business model and community benefits. The findings were released to various news outlets such as the Wall Street Journal. and New York magazine. The Lowline was shown in Time magazine's 25 best inventions of 2015 (Dec7 issue).

=== Lowline Lab ===
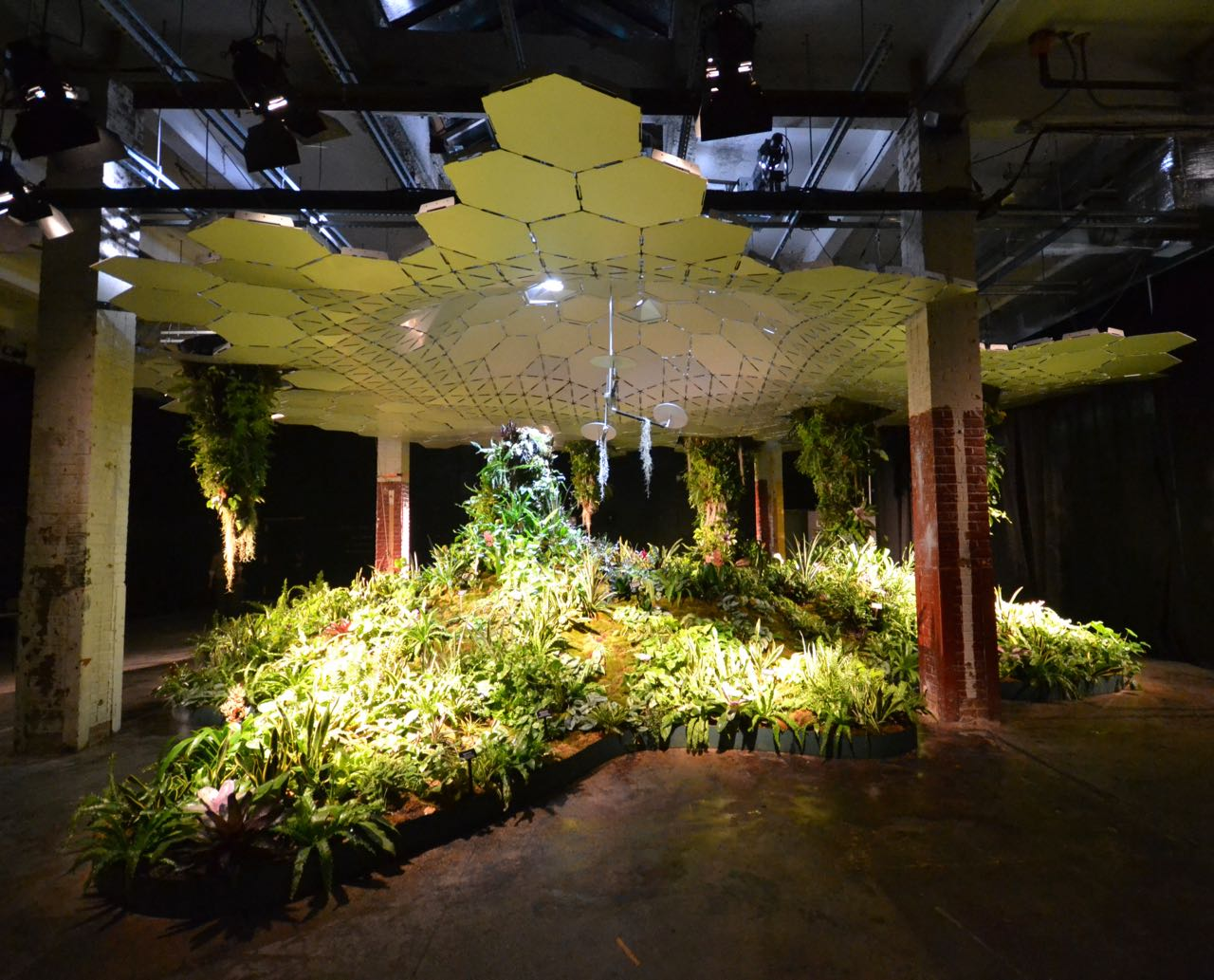
Interior of Lowline Lab

The Lowline Lab was opened in October 2015 as a working prototype to determine the long-term feasibility of the Delancey Underground project. Located several blocks away from the proposed site, the Lab offered a glimpse of what the eventual Lowline could become, employing the same technology that would be used in the permanent space to bring sunlight into a simulated underground environment. The Lab featured over 70 species of plants and more than 3,000 plants in total operating off of a combination of natural sunlight and artificial supplements. The Lab closed to the public on February 26, 2017.

=== Approval and postponement ===
The underground area borders the 1,650,000 square feet (153,000 m^{2}) Seward Park Urban Renewal Area, for which the Economic Development Corporation (EDC) has issued a proposal request (the Lowline site was not included in the request as it was owned by the Metropolitan Transportation Authority or MTA). The EDC later conducted a public bidding process won by the project to develop the terminal. The property will be purchased by the city from the MTA and the design coordinated with the neighboring Essex Crossing development (part of the Seward Park Urban Renewal Area). Construction will depend on private fundraising by the project, public subsidies, and Uniform Land Use Review Procedure approvals for specific components.

As of 2019, the park was under construction and was expected to open in 2021. However, in February 2020, the planners announced it was on hold due to lack of success in fundraising.
