= Essex Market =

Food market in Manhattan, New York

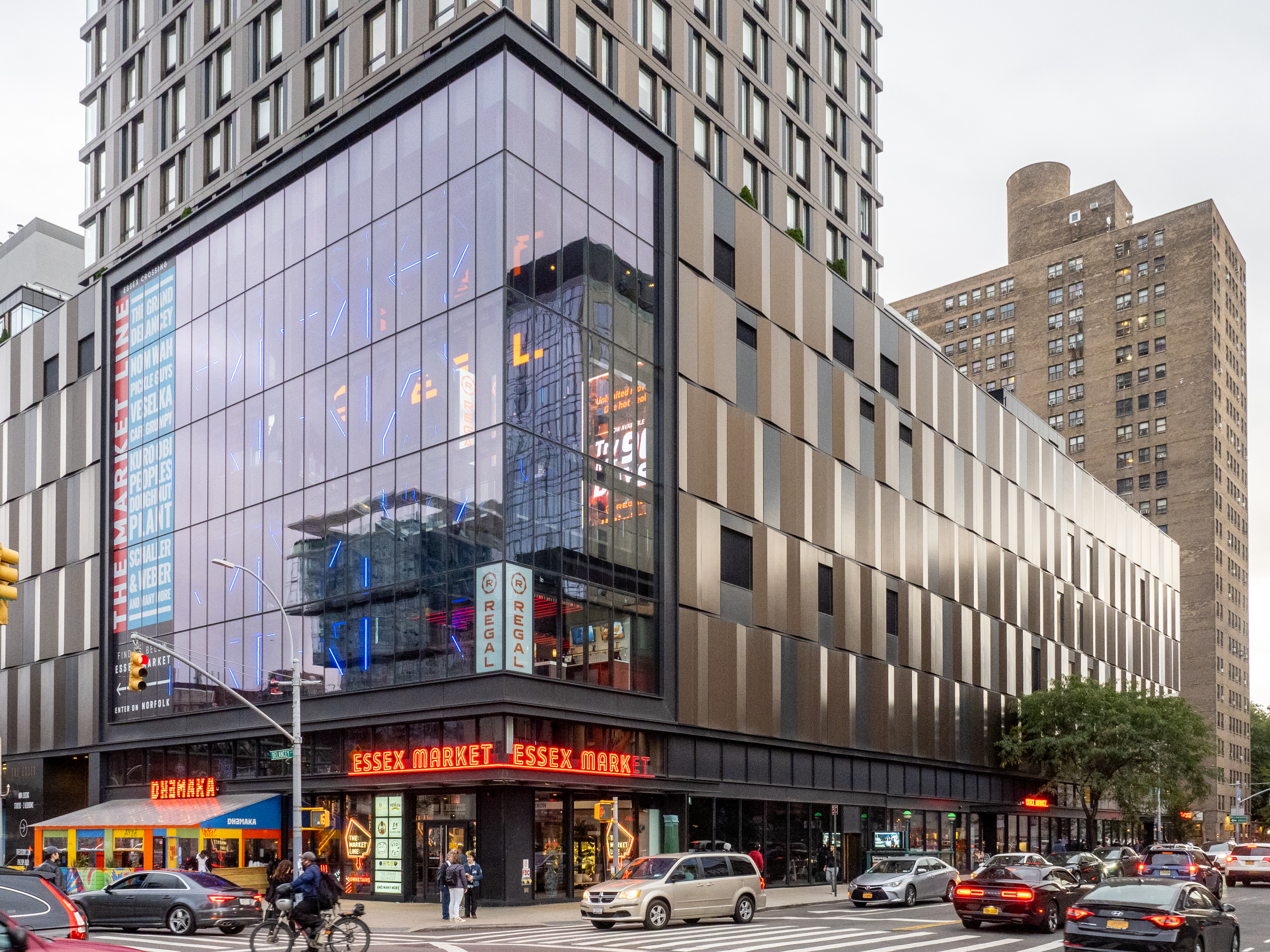
Delancey Street in 2021

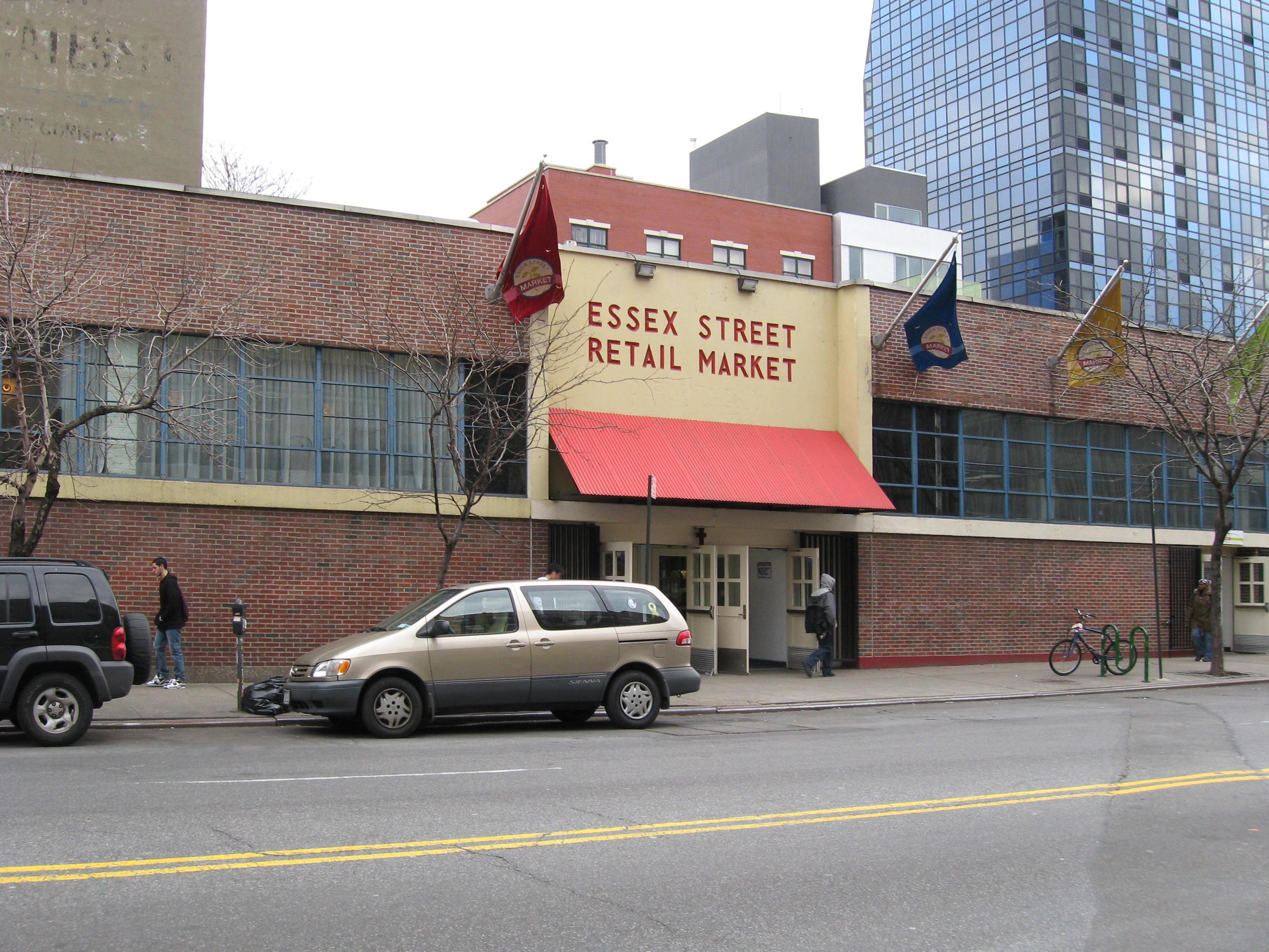
Exterior of Essex Street Market, prior to its rebranding and relocation

Essex Market (formerly known as Essex Street Market) is a food market with independent vendors at the intersection of Essex Street and Delancey Street on the Lower East Side of Manhattan, New York City. The market is known for its many local shops, including grocery stores, bakeries, butchers, seafood shops, coffee vendors, cheese shops, and spice shops. There are small restaurants that serve meals in the market, including Shopsin's. The LES Girls Club and Cuchifritos Gallery + Project Space are also included in the market.

The market opened in 1940, replacing an outdoor market that had operated since the 19th century. During the late 20th century, Essex Street Market began to see a decrease in customers, as supermarkets became increasingly popular. The market was turned over from the city to the individual vendors in 1966 and was taken over by the New York City Economic Development Corporation in 1995. As part of the Essex Crossing redevelopment project that commenced in 2013, Essex Street Market moved to a new location in 2019 and rebranded Essex Market.

== History ==
Essex Market originates from one of the original thirteen markets of 19th-century New York. Essex Market first appeared on maps in 1818. An indoor food market for the East Side of Manhattan was proposed as early as 1936. The proposed market was to be located at Essex Street on the Lower East Side, on land owned by the New York City Board of Transportation. The land had previously been occupied by tenement buildings, which had been razed almost a decade prior, when the land was cleared for the construction of the New York City Subway's Sixth Avenue line under Essex Street. At the time, New York City mayor Fiorello La Guardia had waged a "war on pushcarts", based on the belief that pushcarts were a "...menace to traffic, health and sanitation," according to a New York Times article from 1938. Consequently, pushcart vendors were encouraged to take their business off the streets into covered, indoor markets. Plans for Essex Street Market were filed with the New York City Department of Buildings in November 1938. The city government put a contract for the market's construction for bid in January 1939. The lowest bid was submitted by the Lieb Construction Company, which proposed to build the market for $386,700.

The market was developed at a total cost of $525,000. The city initially planned to open the market in July 1939, but it did not ultimately open until January 9, 1940. The opening of Essex Street Market consisted of a 15-minute ceremony, with a live performance by the Parks Department band. Approximately 3,500 people attended the opening ceremonies. The mayor and his entourage conducted a brief inspection, and then the doors officially flung open to the public. At the time of the market's opening, the Times said that the outdoor market only had "a few sentimental New Yorkers to sigh over its passing". Another section between Rivington and Stanton Streets was opened in June 1948.

The original market spanned between 96-144 Essex Street, bordering Broome Street and Stanton Street. The market consisted of four cinderblock buildings and featured 475 vendors, most of whom had previously operated pushcarts on the street. Vendors were charged $4.25 a week to rent a stall at the market. The vendors sold produce and groceries. Many vendors in the 1940s came from Jewish families, but as the neighborhood began to change, Puerto Rican families increasingly opened shops as well. By the 25th anniversary of the market's opening, thirty-five of the original vendors remained.

== Financial hardships ==
In the 1950s, the market began to see a decrease in customers, as supermarkets became increasingly popular. City Markets Commissioner Albert S. Pacetta proposed in 1964 to close all seven of the city's indoor retail markets, including Essex Street Market, though the proposal was unpopular. The city ultimately turned over the market to the individual vendors in 1966. At the time, there were over 120 merchants.

By the mid-1980s, the market had shrunk to 59 vendors. The city named a private developer to revitalize the market in 1988, but with little success. In 1995, the New York City Economic Development Corporation (NYCEDC) took over the market's operations. The market at that point had been reduced to one building at 120 Essex Street. The NYCEDC invested $1.5 million in the market's redevelopment. The agency proposed to redevelop the unused buildings so they could be occupied by department stores.

Despite the improvements made by NYCEDC, vendors continued to struggle. For example, Jeffrey's Meat Market, a "New York institution," chose to close down due to low sales in 2011. The declining foot traffic, lack of promotion, and the uninviting architecture of the market were seen as contributing factors. In 2015, the vendors joined to form the Essex Street Market Vendors Association to collaborate with other local groups and advocate for their small businesses. Some vendors also complained that the NYCEDC was not doing enough to promote the market. There were also complaints about expenses: although space in the market was heavily subsidized, it still cost $75 per square foot ($810/m^{2}) to rent space in the market, nearly three times the rate during the previous decade. Murals were painted in 2016 in an effort to attract more customers.

== Essex Crossing move ==
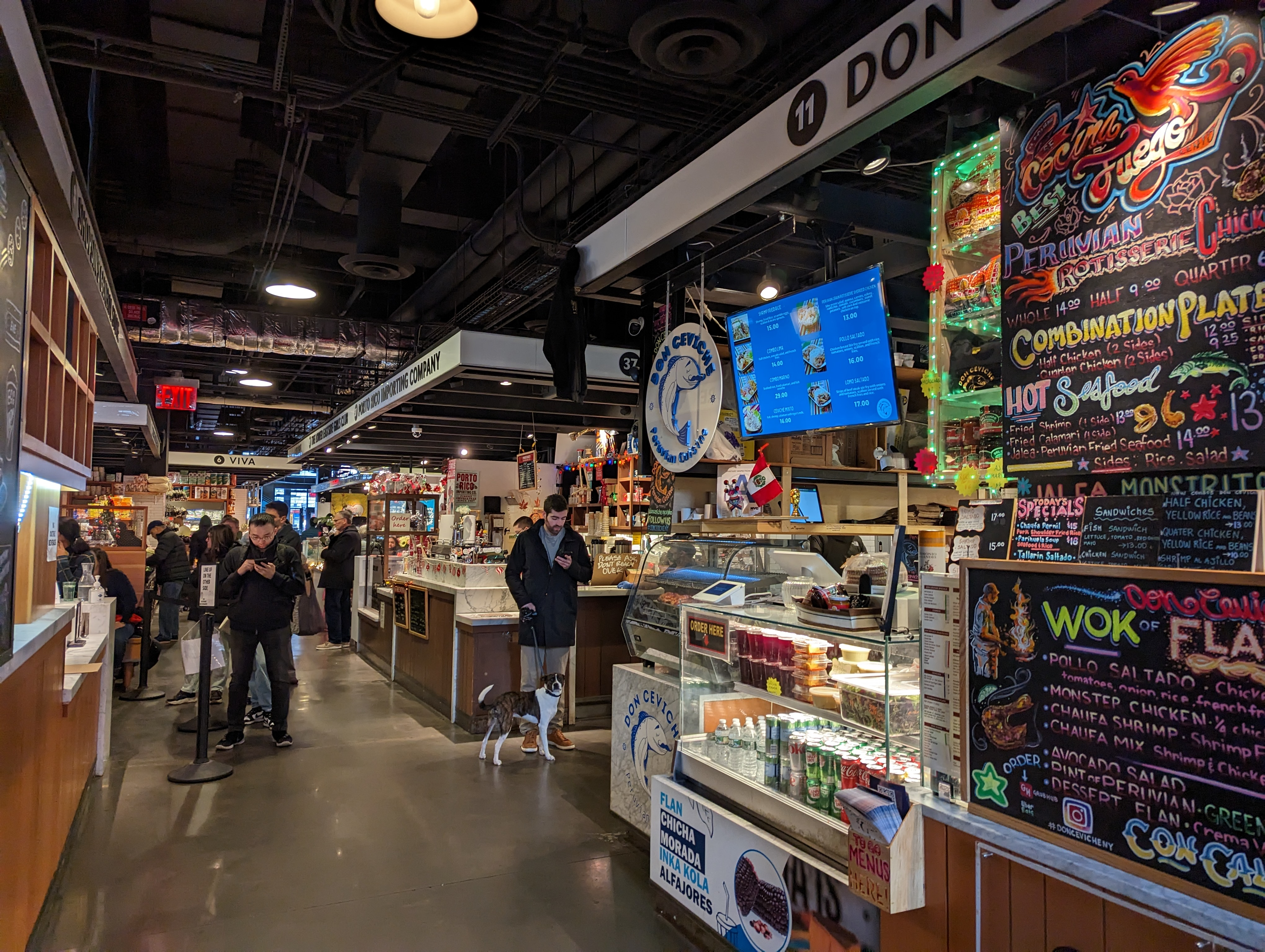
Essex Market shops

The Essex Crossing mixed-use development was announced in 2013, and entailed relocating Essex Street Market to 88 Essex Street. Beginning in October 2017 for four months, the old market was one of several sites for an art installation called "Good Fences Make Good Neighbors", by artist Ai Weiwei. The new location within the Essex Crossing development was originally planned to open in 2018, but was later pushed back to April 2019, then to May 2019. Essex Street Market vendors started moving to the new location in August 2018, with all except one of the 25 vendors relocating. The relocation was completed on May 13, 2019.

The new 37,000-square-foot (3,400 m^{2}) space was three times larger than the location at 120 Essex. Various local organizations were involved in its development, including Delancey Street Associates, the Essex Street Market Vendors Association, and Community Board 3. The majority of the vendors moved to the new location, in addition to fifteen new vendors. In November 2019, the Market Line, an additional market and restaurant space, opened downstairs. In part because of decreased business after the COVID-19 pandemic in New York City, the Market Line announced in early 2024 that it would close that April.
