= Taconic Investment Partners =

Taconic Investment Partners LLC
- Company type: Private company
- Industry: Real estate
- Founded: 1997
- Headquarters: New York, NY, U.S.
- Key people: Charles R. Bendit Co-CEO; Paul E. Pariser Co-CEO
- Website: taconicinvestments.com

Taconic Investment Partners is a real estate developer in New York City. They have been involved in projects such as Essex Crossing, American Bank Note Company Printing Plant, 111 Eighth Avenue (where they have their offices) and Coney Island.

Taconic was formed in 1998 by Charles R. Bendit and Paul E. Pariser. 111 Eighth Avenue was one of their first investments The firm became well known when they sold the building to Google for $2 billion in 2010.
