= Williamsburg Bridge Trolley Terminal =

Former terminal in Manhattan, New York

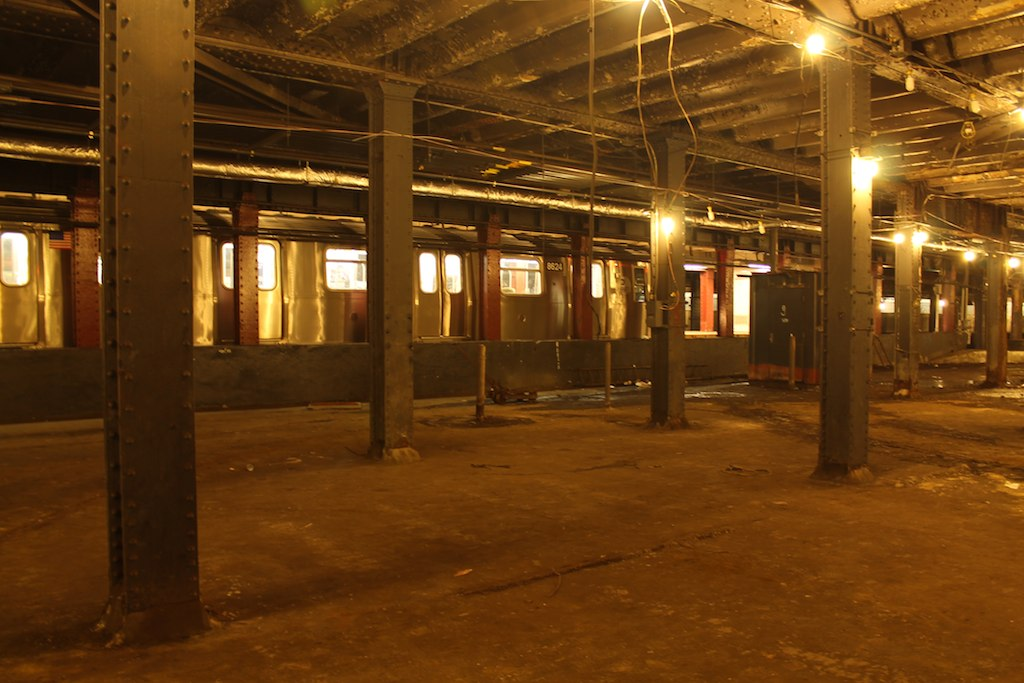
- The now-closed trolley terminal in 2013.

General information
- Location: Delancey Street & Essex Street; New York, NY 10002; United States
- Coordinates: 40.71851°N 73.988199°W
- System: Streetcar terminal
- Owner: City of New York
- Operator: Brooklyn Rapid Transit Company (1908–1923); New York City Department of Plant and Structures (1923–1931); Brooklyn–Manhattan Transit Corporation (1931–1940); New York City Board of Transportation (1940–1948)
- Platforms: 7
- Tracks: 8

Construction
- Structure type: Underground

History
- Opened: May 19, 1908
- Closed: December 6, 1948

Services
None (abandoned)
Location

The Williamsburg Bridge Trolley Terminal, also called the Essex Street Trolley Terminal or Delancey Street Trolley Terminal, was a trolley terminal located underground adjacent to the Essex Street subway station on the Lower East Side of Manhattan. Passenger trolley service operated through the terminal from 1908 until 1948 when trolley service over the Williamsburg Bridge ended. The station was constructed with balloon loops for turning around streetcars after they crossed over the Williamsburg Bridge to send them back to Brooklyn.

In 2011 a proposal was made to turn the Williamsburg Bridge Trolley Terminal into the Lowline park.

== Layout ==
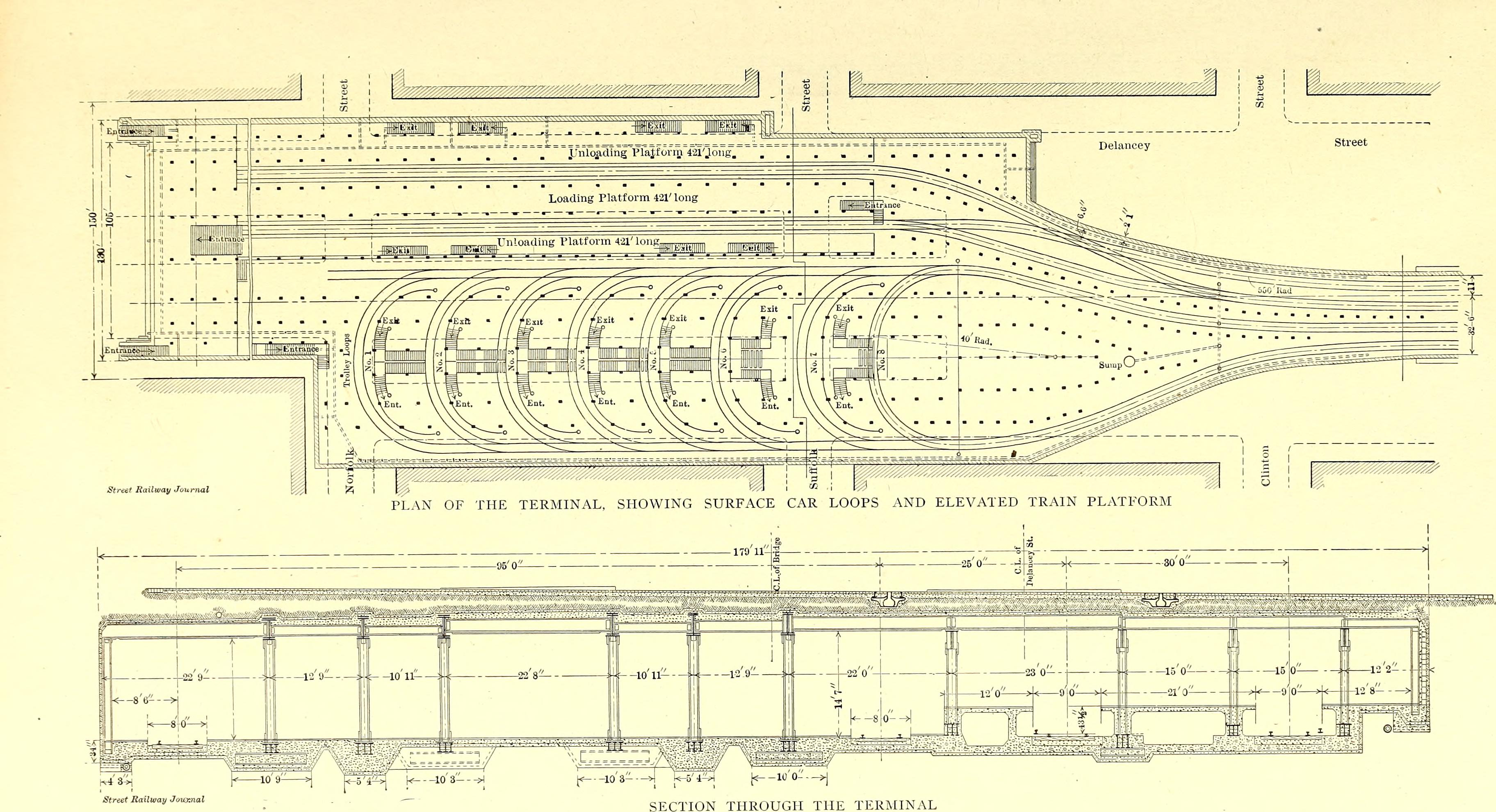
A plan of the underground trolley terminal and the adjacent Essex Street subway station.

=== Underground terminal ===
The trolley terminal is located under the south side of Delancey Street between Clinton Street to the east and Norfolk Street to the west, one block east of Essex Street. The terminal is adjacent to the Brooklyn-bound subway track of the Essex Street subway station. The terminal consisted of eight balloon loops which fed directly into and out of the trolley tracks on the south side of the Williamsburg Bridge, allowing trolleys running over the bridge to reverse direction and return to Brooklyn. The loops were numbered 1 through 8 from west to east. Each loop was assigned to at most two streetcar services. In between the loops were seven low-level island platforms, slightly raised from track level. Each platform had 12 foot-wide staircases leading to the street. Each loop could hold two trolley cars, with a trolley stopping at the west end of the platform to discharge Manhattan-bound passengers, then moving up to the east end to pick up Brooklyn-bound passengers. The terminal was designed with both electrical incandescent lighting and vaults that allowed natural light to enter the station.

Below are the list of routes that served each loop:

- Loop 1: Nostrand Avenue Line, Belt Line
- Loop 2: Broadway Line, Reid Avenue Line
- Loop 3: Wilson Avenue Line
- Loop 4: Ralph Avenue Line
- Loop 5: Bushwick Avenue Line
- Loop 6: Sumner Avenue Line, Tompkins Avenue Line
- Loop 7: Williamsburg Bridge Local
- Loop 8: Grand Street Line, Franklin Avenue Line

=== Surface terminal ===
At ground-level was an additional terminal for through-trolley service from the New York Railways Company and Third Avenue Railway, whose lines traveled from Manhattan along the north side of the bridge to the Washington Plaza trolley terminal in Williamsburg, Brooklyn. The covered exit stairs from the subway and underground terminal led directly to the shelters serving the Manhattan surface trolleys. Both the staircases and shelters were designed with terracotta features. The exit stairs were designed as kiosks constructed of concrete, and finished with blue and white tiling.

=== Transfers ===
Brooklyn trolley lines which crossed the Williamsburg Bridge and terminated at the terminal included the Belt Line, Broadway Line, Bushwick Avenue Line, Franklin Avenue Line, Grand Street Line, Marcy Avenue Line, Nostrand Avenue Line, Ralph Avenue Line, Sumner Avenue Line, Reid Avenue Line, Tompkins Avenue Line, and Wilson Avenue Line (also called the Hamburg Avenue Line). Several of these lines, including the Franklin, Nostrand, Tompkins, and Reid Lines, traveled via the Culver surface line to the Culver Depot in Coney Island. The Marcy Avenue line traveled to a racetrack in Sheepshead Bay. The Wilson Avenue Line traveled to the resorts in Canarsie. The Grand Street Line, meanwhile, traveled via the Junction Boulevard Line to the North Beach amusement area in northern Queens, now the site of LaGuardia Airport.

== History ==
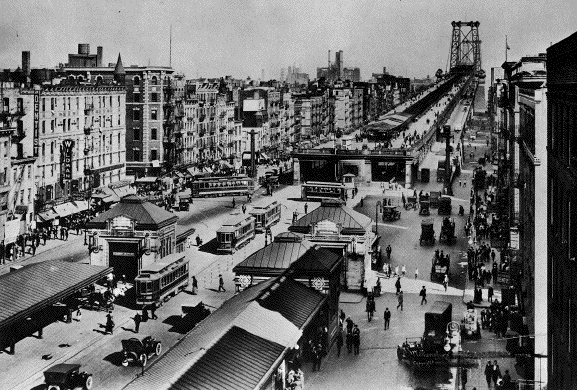
Williamsburg Bridge and Delancey Street, 1919. Kiosks in center go down to underground trolley terminal; larger one to left goes to subway. Foreground: waiting areas for Manhattan streetcars

The Williamsburg Bridge opened on December 19, 1903. In March 1904, it was determined that Brooklyn streetcars operated by the Brooklyn Rapid Transit Company (BRT) would cross the bridge and terminate at Delancey Street, while the Manhattan trolleys of the New York Railways Company would terminate at Washington Plaza in Williamsburg. On November 6, 1904, BRT streetcars including the Reid Avenue Line began crossing the bridge to Lower Manhattan. In 1905, it was decided to build a permanent underground terminal for Brooklyn surface cars and future elevated cars coming from the BRT's Broadway elevated; this station would eventually become the first stop of the BMT Nassau Street Line. The Essex Street trolley terminal was constructed along with the adjoining subway station, but was delayed due to changes in the plans for the subway station. Both stations were constructed using cut-and-cover methods, by excavating Delancey Street. In addition, the approaches of the subway tracks and the southern bridge trolley tracks were lowered into ramps leading to the terminal. As a temporary solution until the terminal was completed, trolleys terminated at stub-end tracks on the street. This setup, however, was inefficient and led to passenger congestion. The underground trolley terminal opened on May 19, 1908, with New York City mayor George B. McClellan Jr. operating the first streetcar over the bridge into the terminal. The new terminal allowed the BRT to double the capacity of its streetcar operations over the bridge.

Construction of a Centre Street Subway Loop to connect the Williamsburg and Manhattan Bridges was begun. It was never completed but rather was incorporated into the BMT Nassau Street Line.

On December 1, 1923, service on the now-Brooklyn–Manhattan Transit Corporation (BMT) lines over the Williamsburg Bridge ended, due to decreasing profits and a dispute with the city over tolls. BMT service was truncated to Washington Plaza in Williamsburg, and bridge service was replaced with municipal shuttle service. On February 15, 1931, BMT streetcars once again began running to Manhattan after municipal shuttle service ended. Only the Nostrand, Ralph, Reid, and Tompkins lines resumed traveling over the bridge, while the remaining lines continued to terminate in Brooklyn. On December 6, 1948, the last of the streetcar lines to run over the bridge, the "Williamsburg Bridge Local" shuttle between the Manhattan and Brooklyn trolley terminals, was converted into the B39 bus route. Afterwards, the Essex Street terminal was closed, and the kiosks to the terminal and subway station were removed from Delancey Street.
