= Millennium High School (New York City) =

Public school in New York City

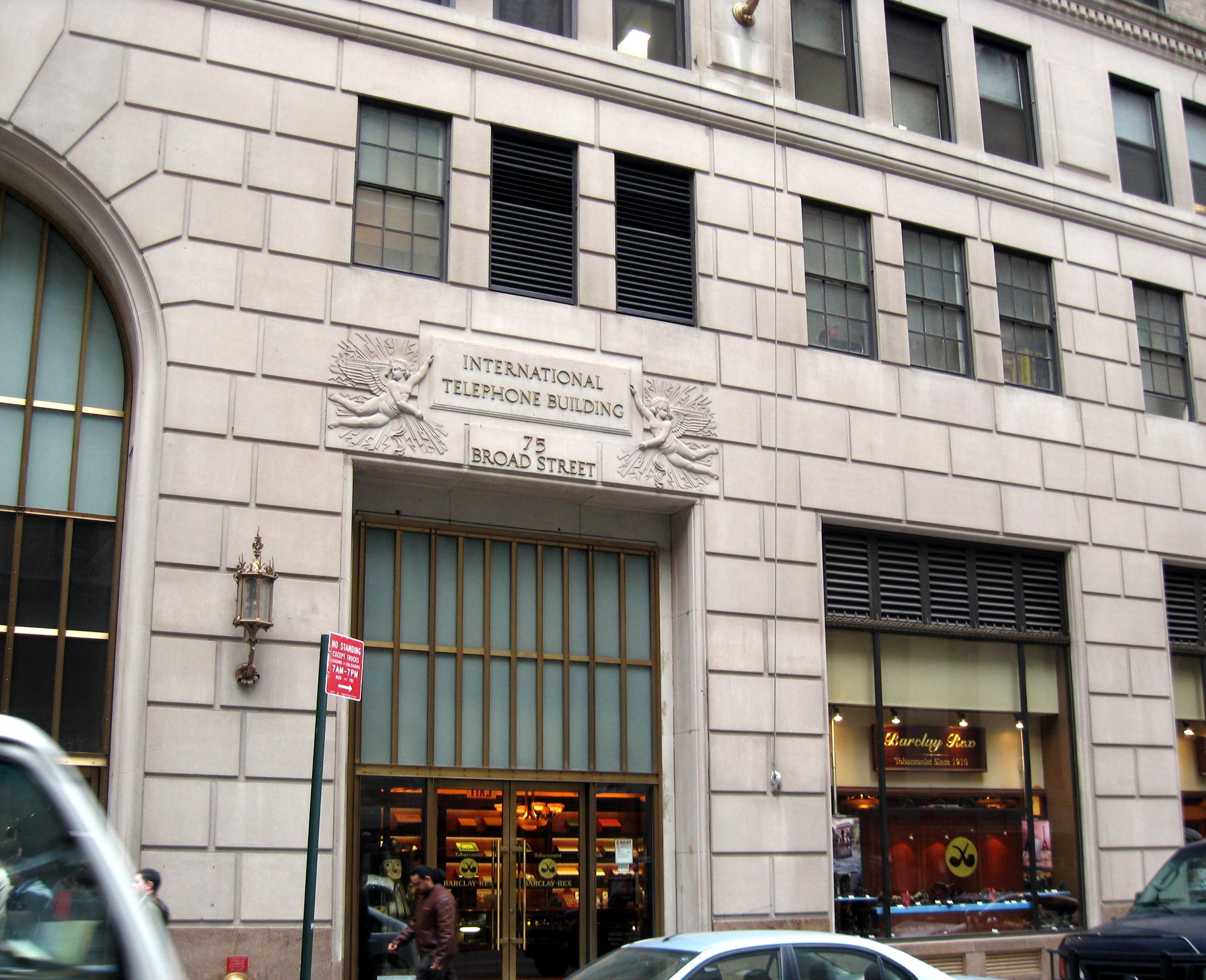

Location
- 75 Broad St; New York, New York 10004; United States; 40.704606°N 74.011444°W

Information
- Type: Public, Selective school
- Established: 2002
- School district: New York City Geographic District #2
- NCES School ID: 360007705085
- Principal: Robert Rhodes
- Teaching staff: 43.00 (on an FTE basis)
- Grades: 9-12
- Enrollment: 648 (2021-2022)
- Student to teacher ratio: 15.07
- Campus: City: Large
- Colors: Black and Red
- Athletics conference: PSAL
- Mascot: Phoenix
- Website: www.millenniumhs.org

Millennium High School is a selective public high school for grades 9 through 12 in Manhattan. It is operated by the New York City Department of Education in Region 9. The Phoenix is the school's mascot, meant to symbolize the school rising from the ashes of the World Trade Center following the September 11 attacks. In 2016, the school received more than 6,000 applications for 170 seats, yielding an acceptance rate of less than 3%. Admission to MHS is based on selective criteria including a middle school GPA of 90 or above, attendance, and state test scores in reading and math.

== Demographics ==
The student body is 64% female, 36% male, 41% Asian, 31% Caucasian, 15% Latino, 7% African American, 2% Native American Indian or Alaskan Native and 5% multi-racial or other. Approximately 44% are eligible for free or reduced lunch and many students are also first-generation students.

== History ==
Millennium High School was founded in 2002. Madelyn Wils, as chair of Manhattan Community Board 1, led an effort raising $16 million to build the school and coordinated planning and site construction. Additional funding included a $500,000 grant from New Visions for Public Schools with money donated from the Bill & Melinda Gates Foundation, and contributions from the Carnegie Corporation and the Open Society Institute. School site development was also made possible with several million dollars' worth of grants from the federal government in 2003 as part of an effort to revitalize the Lower Manhattan area following the September 11, 2001 attacks.

An "offshoot" or "sister" school, Millennium Brooklyn High School in Park Slope, was opened in 2011 with an aim to replicate the model of the Manhattan school. The Brooklyn school is controversial because its students are predominantly Asian and white, while it shares the John Jay Educational Campus with three other schools which serve mostly Black and Latino students, leading to accusations of segregation and unequal treatment.

== Campus ==
The school occupies the 11th, 12th, and 13th floors of the former ITT building, in Lower Manhattan's Financial District. The interior is modern, colorful, open, cold, and well-lit. The design uses large rooms and gathering spaces more often than corridors and sealed doors, because of its location in an office building. Due to the limited space available, some classes take place in these open spaces of the school, rather than in a classroom. These spaces are equipped with Projectors and the needed facilities for classroom learning, effectively functioning as open-space classrooms.

Millennium High School does not currently have a traditional school gymnasium and instead has an Exercise Machine gym on the 12th floor and a Multipurpose Room on the ground floor that is also used as an auditorium.

There are plans being made to expand to the fourteenth floor to accommodate overcrowding.

== Academics and extracurriculars ==
All MHS students take four years of English, Social Studies, Mathematics, and Science, as well as three years of Foreign Language—either Spanish or Mandarin. There are two to three hours of homework each night and 20 hours of annual community service to fulfill. Millennium offers a rigorous schedule, though as a small school, the Advanced Placement courses are few: AP English (language and literature), AP United States History, AP Studio Art, AP World History, AP Biology, AP Chemistry, AP Calculus BC, and AP Physics 2. Recently, it became a STEM school after incorporating Engineering into the curriculum. The school has a partnership with the YMCA of Greater New York, and provides numerous extracurricular offerings, sports organizations, and other activities for the students. Ninth and tenth-grade students take core classes in English, Math, Science, and History. Eleventh and twelfth-grade students have the chance to take AP course and specific courses in different subjects. In addition to this, junior and senior year students have the opportunity to take College Now classes as well as college classes at Pace University.

MHS students can participate in after-school clubs. These include Student Government & Ethics, Senior Officers, Art Club, Chess Club, Drama Club, Environmental Club, Equestrian Club, Film Club, Fitness Club, Foreign Exchange, Gay Straight Alliance, Math Team, Myriad - Literary Arts Magazine, MHS Newspaper, Key Club, Peer Mediation, Phoenix Dance Club, School of Rock, Shakespeare Monologues.

== Athletics ==
Originally, Millennium High School's sports teams were called the Millennium Phoenixes, and they drew players from MHS (Manhattan) and Millennium Brooklyn High School. The fact that the Millennium Phoenixes were separate from, and sometimes rivals of, the John Jay Jayhawks, despite being based in the same building, created tensions. Since Fall 2021, the two Millennium schools' teams have been merged with those of the other three schools at John Jay Educational Campus, and are known as the John Jay Jaguars. The change was intended to remedy an inequality of sports opportunities between the larger, mostly white and Asian sports program at Millennium and the mostly Black and Latino sports program at John Jay.

The Public Schools Athletic League sports offered (as John Jay Campus) are: baseball, basketball, cross country, fencing, flag football, indoor and outdoor track, soccer, softball, stunt, swimming, table tennis, and volleyball.

== Faculty ==
Former principal Robert Rhodes has long been a public school teacher and administrator. He received Clark University's Secondary Educator of the Year award in 2003. He announced on February 16, 2012, that he would step down from his position after June 2012 to become principal at Horace Greeley High School in Chappaqua, NY. The staff of Millennium High School all have master's degrees and have attended colleges and universities including: NYU, Dartmouth, University of Connecticut, Stanford, Barnard, University of Rochester, Bucknell, Columbia, Michigan, Haverford, MIT, Indiana, Connecticut College, The Ohio State University, Cornell, Rutgers, Wellesley, Skidmore, Wisconsin, UMass, Tufts, and Duke. Many have been recipients of highly competitive grants and have studied around the world. Current Principal Colin McEvoy is a founding faculty member at Millennium High School. Formerly a Peace Corps volunteer in Estonia, where he taught English as a second language, he received a master's degree at Columbia University Teachers College. Assistant Principal Latika Keegan is also a graduate of Columbia University Teachers College, where she received a master's degree in Computing in Education. She also holds master's degrees in English Literature, and Educational Leadership. The faculty members of MHS all have master's degrees in their respective fields, and many have been recipients of highly competitive grants. Some of the school's faculty participate in professional development programs such as the Pace Inquiry Learning Collaborative, while others are recipients of fellowships from Math for America and Fund for Teachers.

== Awards and recognition ==
MHS is a recipient of the 2006 Rising Star High School Award, one of Manhattan Media's Blackboard Awards and is regularly featured in NYC Best Public High Schools. MHS was ranked #8 by the New York Post in their Top 40 Public High Schools in NYC online article. Niche ranked it #43 in their 2017 Most Diverse Public High Schools in NY out of a total of 907 schools and #87 in their 2017 College Readiness Ranking in NY out of a total of 1,165 schools. U.S. News continuously ranks Millennium High School as one of the best high schools in NY and nationwide, earning gold medals and silver medals. In 2017, Millennium High School became the 5th most sought-after school in the city after schools like Townsend Harris High School and Hunter Science High School.
