= Delancey Street =

Street in Manhattan, New York

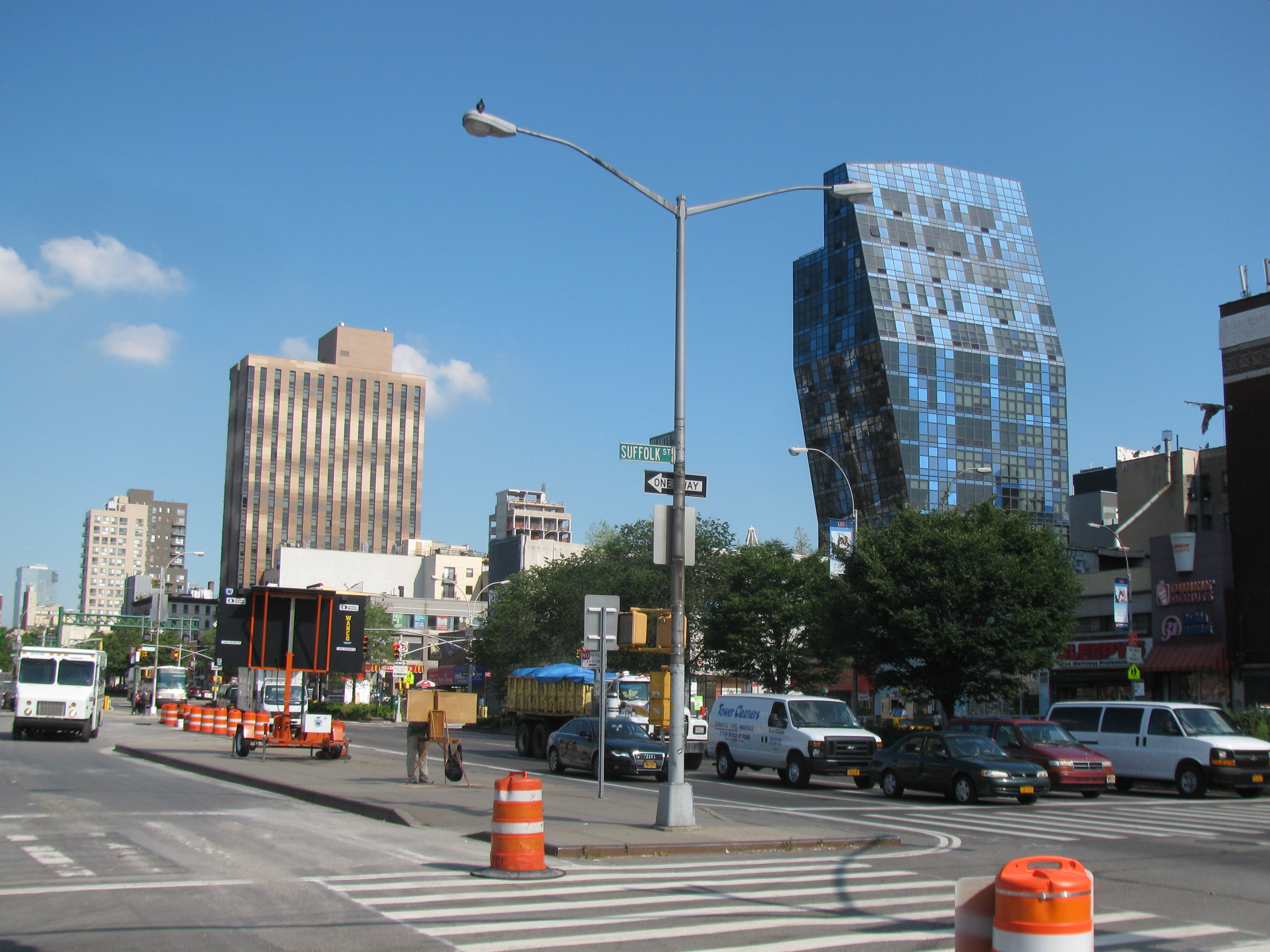
- Delancey Street and the Blue Condominium from Suffolk Street looking west
- Interactive map of Delancey Street
- Namesake: James De Lancey
- Maintained by: NYCDOT
- Length: 0.9 mi (1.4 km)
- Location: Lower East Side, Manhattan, New York City
- Postal code: 10002
- Coordinates: 40°43′07″N 73°59′18″W
- West end: Bowery (continues west as Kenmare Street)
- Major junctions: Chrystie Street; Forsyth Street; Eldridge Street; Allen Street; Orchard Street; Ludlow Street; Essex Street; Norfolk Street; Suffolk Street; Clinton Street / Williamsburg Bridge; Attorney Street; Ridge Street; Pitt Street; Columbia Street; Baruch Drive
- East end: FDR Drive

Delancey Street is one of the main thoroughfares of the Lower East Side in Manhattan, New York City. It runs from the street's western terminus at the Bowery to its eastern end at FDR Drive, connecting to the Williamsburg Bridge and Brooklyn at Clinton Street. It is an eight-lane, median-divided street, which is west of Clinton Street, and a service road for the Williamsburg Bridge east of Clinton Street. West of Bowery, Delancey Street becomes Kenmare Street, which continues as a four-lane, undivided street to Lafayette Street.

Delancey Street is named after James De Lancey Sr., chief justice, lieutenant governor, and acting colonial governor of the Province of New York, whose farm was located in what is now called the Lower East Side.

Businesses range from delis to check-cashing stores to bars. Delancey Street has long been known for its discount and bargain clothing stores. Famous establishments include the Bowery Ballroom, built in 1929, Ratner's kosher restaurant (now closed), and the Essex Street Market, which was built by Mayor Fiorello La Guardia to avoid pushcart congestion on the neighborhood's narrow streets.

Until the middle 20th century, Delancey Street was a main shopping street in the predominantly Jewish and Irish Lower East Side. Since the late 2000s, the neighborhood around Delancey is more diverse; including African Americans, Puerto Ricans, Dominicans, and Chinese. Gentrification has brought more upscale retail and nightlife establishments.

In 2026, the administration of Mayor Zohran Mamdani announced plans to redesign Delancey Street for $70 million to improve sidewalks and bike lanes. This redesign was to be funded partially by a $21 million federal grant disbursed in 2023.

== Transportation ==
The New York City Subway's F, <F>, J, M, and Z trains serve the Delancey Street/Essex Street station, and the J and Z trains also stop at the Bowery station.

Under New York City Bus, the B39 is Delancey Street’s main bus, running between Allen & Clinton Streets. In addition, the M14D SBS and M21 run in the westbound direction to Columbia Street, where the former terminates, from the FDR Drive and Lewis Street, respectively (eastbound M21 buses cross on the FDR Drive). The M9 and M14A SBS cross on Essex Street, the M15 and M15 SBS on Allen Street, and the M103 on Bowery.

The Williamsburg Bridge Trolley Terminal, beneath Delancey and Essex Streets, was a station and balloon loop for streetcars crossing the Williamsburg Bridge from Brooklyn. The Lowline, an underground public park in which natural light would be directed using fiber optics to create a setting in which trees and grass could be grown indoors, was proposed in 2011.

Because Delancey Street is very wide, and because of its high rate of fatalities, safety measures were erected along its length in the 2000s and 2010s. This includes pedestrian plazas, bans on left turns along the street, and pedestrian countdown signals. A protected bike lane was constructed on Delancey Street from Chrystie Street to the Williamsburg Bridge in November 2018, in advance of the 14th Street Tunnel shutdown. In January 2023, city officials received a $21 million grant from the federal government to add bike lanes, widen sidewalks, and reduce vehicular lanes along Delancey Street.

== Kenmare Street ==
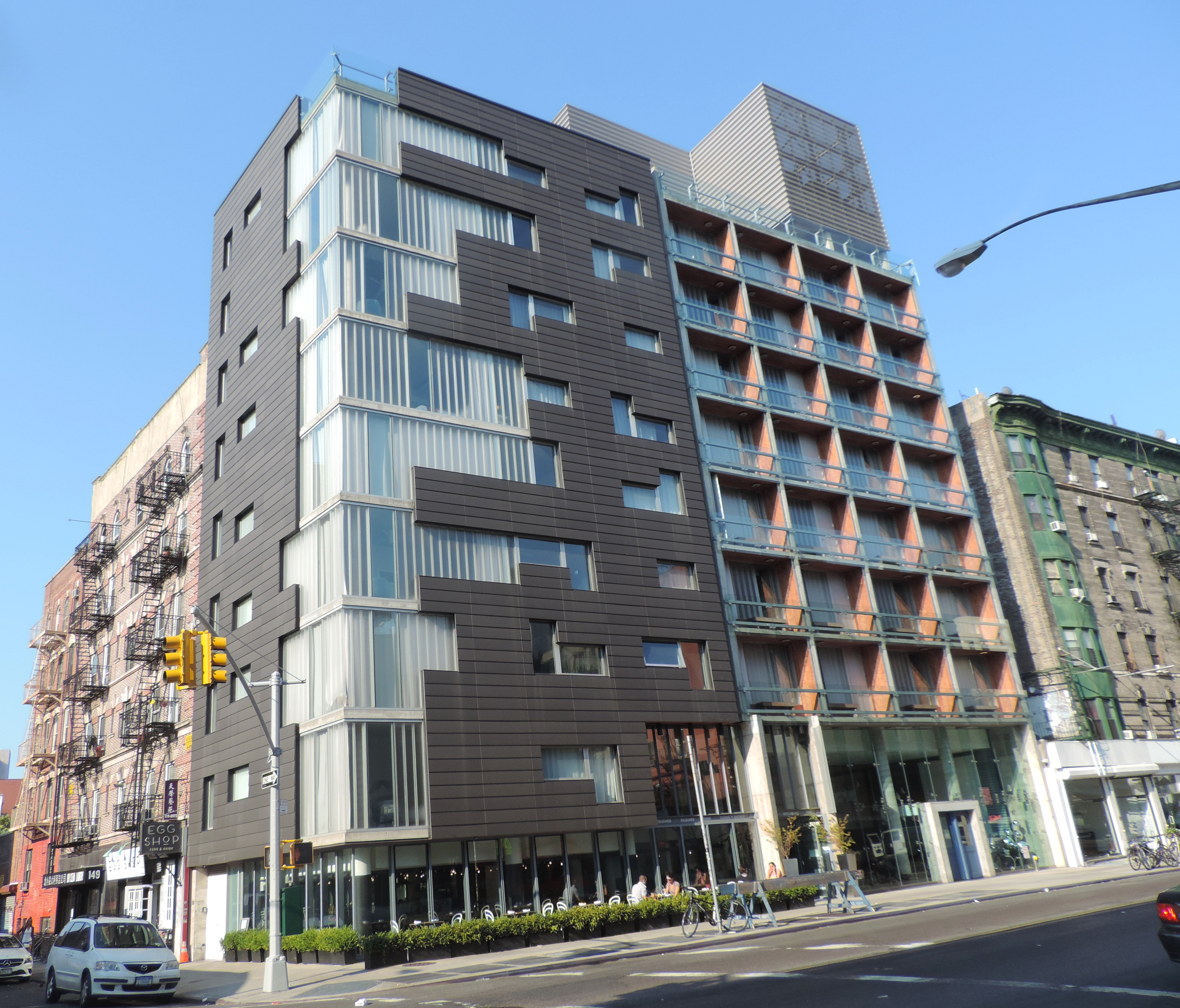
Nolita Hotel, Kenmare and Elizabeth Streets

Kenmare Street is the western extension of Delancey Street, running five blocks from the Bowery to Lafayette Street. It is a major thoroughfare for traffic traveling westbound to the Holland Tunnel. The street was founded in 1911, by Tim Sullivan, the son of immigrants Daniel O’Sullivan and Catherine Connelly, who came from Kenmare, County Kerry, Ireland.
