= Blue Condominium =

Residential skyscraper in Manhattan, New York

The Blue Condominium
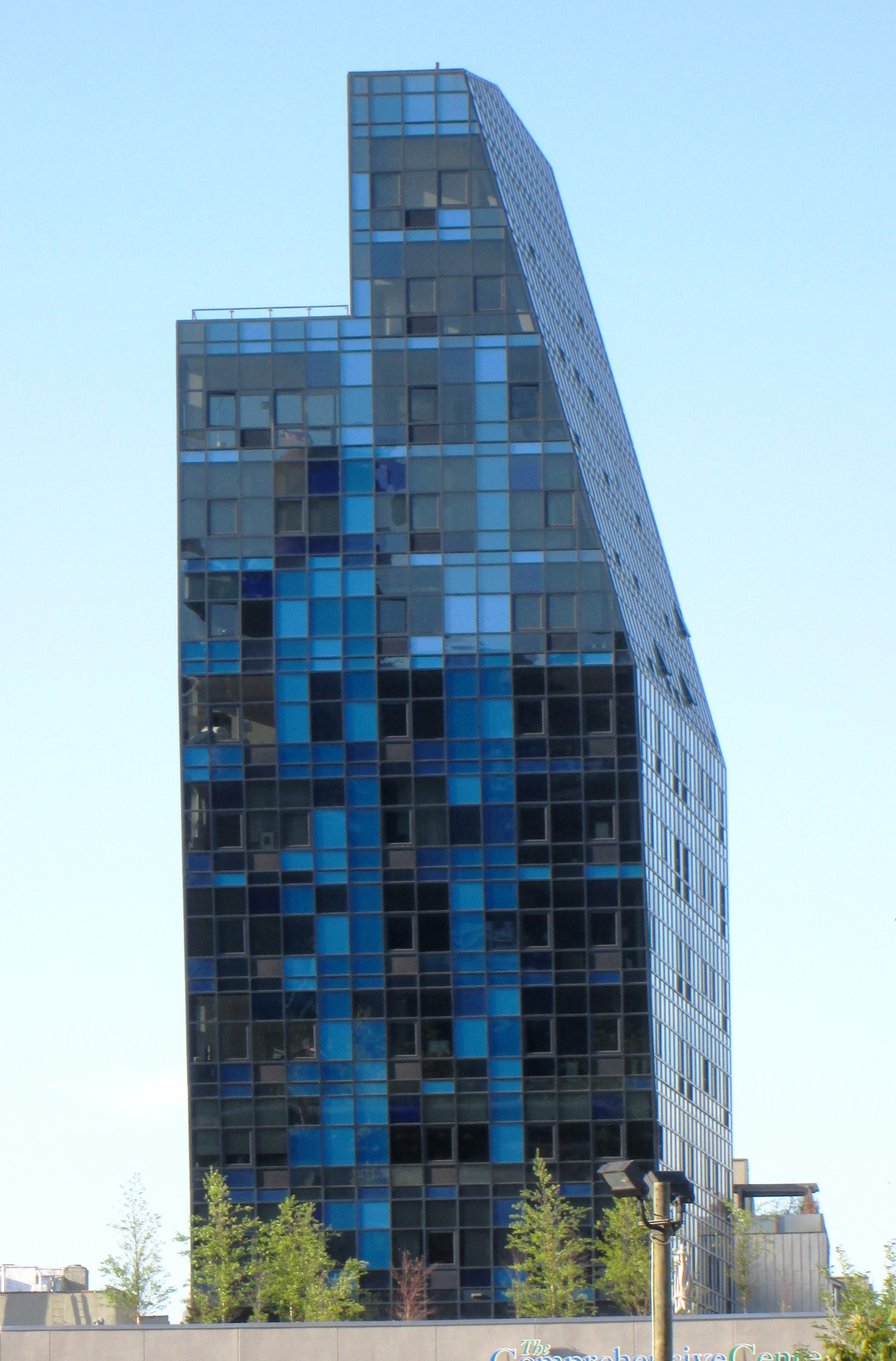
- As seen from Broome Street
- Interactive map of the The Blue Condominium area
- Alternative names: Blue Tower

General information
- Type: Residential
- Location: Lower East Side, Manhattan, New York City, 105 Norfolk Street, New York, NY 10002, United States
- Coordinates: 40.71845°N 73.98739°W
- Completed: 2007
- Cost: US$17 million
- Client: Angelo Consentini and John Carson

Height
- Height: 169 feet (52 m)

Technical details
- Structural system: cast-in-place concrete
- Floor count: 16
- Floor area: 50,000 square feet (4,600 m^{2}) residential, 3,000 square feet (280 m^{2}) commercial

Design and construction
- Architect: Bernard Tschumi with SLCE Architects
- Structural engineer: Thornton Tomasetti Engineers
- Other designers: Arc Consultants, Inc. (code), Israel Berger & Associates, Inc. (curtain wall consultant), Ettinger Engineers (MEP engineer)
- Main contractor: On the Level Enterprises, Inc.

Website
- bluecondominiumnyc.com

The Blue Condominium, also known as the Blue Tower, is located on the Lower East Side of Manhattan in New York City at 105 Norfolk Street. Designed by Bernard Tschumi, it is his first residential and first high-rise structure. At 16 stories tall, it opened in 2007 with 32 condominium apartments, a ground floor commercial space occupied by the Thierry Goldberg Gallery, and a third floor roof terrace for residents. Commercial at the ground floor with residential above is a common method of programming space in urban residential projects. The tower is not LEED certified. The faceted pixelated form, a reaction to the zoning and set back requirements, is clad in a blue panel and window curtain wall system, contrasting with the low rise brick buildings that typify the neighborhood.

== Construction ==
The Blue Condominium opened in November 2007 and was planned, designed, and constructed in two years. It was able to be built due to the purchase of air rights from several neighboring buildings. Developers Angelo Consentini and John Carson commissioned the project, and their company, On the Level Enterprises, was the general contractor.

Historically the Lower East Side was an immigrant neighborhood, including Germans, Jewish, Irish, Italians, and Hispanics, but it has been experiencing a period of gentrification since the late 1990s. The building's construction sparked debate among residents, design professionals, and the general public as an example of the growing number of new luxury condominiums in the neighborhood, a phenomenon that has caused concern about the physical and demographic preservation of the neighborhood and the preservation of its character.

Construction of the tower involved several milestones. For Bernard Tschumi, it was his first residential building and skyscraper. For the Lower East Side, this was the first building with 24-hour doorman service, along with cold storage for food deliveries.

=== Site and context ===
The Blue Condominium is located in the future Essex Crossing development, with Delancey Street and the Williamsburg Bridge to the south, public housing and the East River to the east, low-rise apartments and Houston Street to the north, and the Essex Street Market and Sara D. Roosevelt Park to the west.

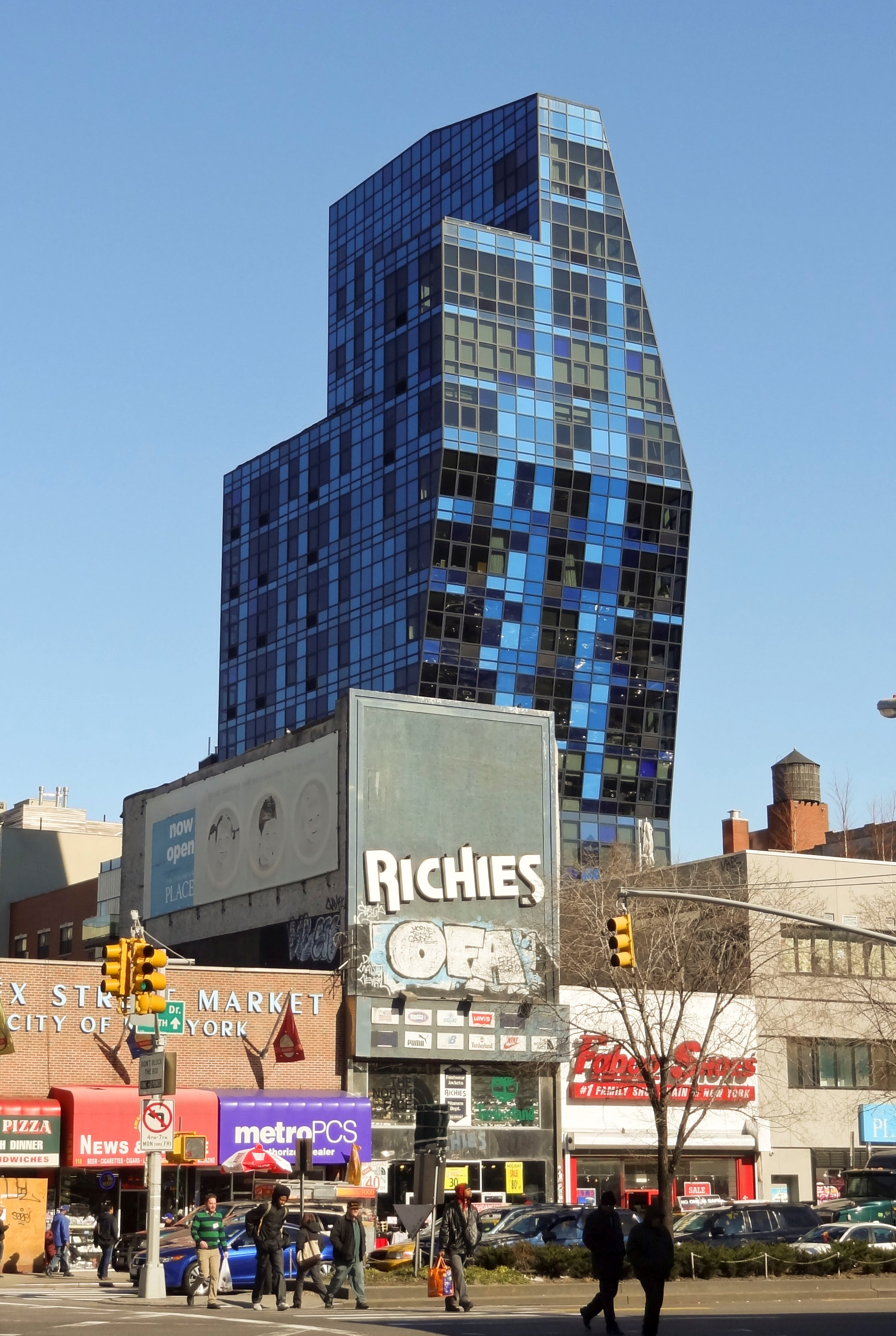

The tower is positioned within the primarily residential neighborhood of the Lower East Side where several urban planning projects have been built. Notable interventions include the Williamsburg Bridge that opened in 1903 and the Essex Street Market that opened in 1940. The Lower Manhattan Expressway, planned by Robert Moses but never constructed, would have been a monumental public intervention, including the probable destruction of the Blue Tower site along with thousands of other properties lining Delancey Street. Since the Blue Condo was built, there are now other tall, modern buildings including Essex Crossing and 100 Norfolk St.

Beginning over a decade ago, Manhattan experienced a boom in development and construction, including the Lower East Side with the construction of high-rise luxury residential towers. The Hotel on Rivington, completed in 2005, was the first high-rise building on the Lower East Side. Just north of the Blue Tower site is the nArchitects Switch Building, also a luxury residential building. In 1996, the site was a parking lot, along with several other lots across the street. These have all been replaced by infill construction consisting exclusively of luxury condominiums.

Since the Zoning Resolution of 1961, the site has been zoned as R7-A (residential) with adjacent lots zoned as C6 and C4, both commercial areas. The area is included in the map amendment of 2002, and adjacent to a Business Improvement District (BID). The area is not a part of a designated historic district, nor are any surrounding buildings landmarked. As of 2012, the site is located within a FRESH program district, along with all of the Lower East Side. Food Retail Expansion to Support Health program (FRESH) is a New York City program providing zoning and financial incentives to establish grocery stores in underserved areas, thereby providing residents with the means to obtain a full selection of food products.

=== Materials and methods ===
With a flat plate, cast-in-place concrete structural system, the Blue Condominium is built like many high-rise residential buildings in New York City. What is not similar to other high-rise residential towers is the unconventional massing that required special floor plate cantilevering and curtain wall detailing, such as floor plates on fourth floor cantilever up to 11' 0" and up to 21' 0" on the twelfth floor. These cantilevered plates are a function of the angular form. The curtain wall system is a Uni-Wall Curtain Wall System by Architectural Glazing Technology. Some of the corners have up to four angled walls connecting to each other and these relationships required 3D modeling. Unlike conventional curtain wall construction, the system employed unitized components that were glazed, sealed, and assembled in the factory, shipped to the site, then assembled in the field. The curtain wall system is composed of clear glass pieces, tinted blue vision glass pieces, and opaque spandrel panels in four shades of blue.

Interior materials vary depend on their location, either in standard apartments, premium apartments, or common areas. In the standard apartments, materials include bamboo and stone flooring, white tiled bathrooms, white stone kitchen counters, and metal cabinets. In the premium apartments, materials include palm and stone flooring, glass tiled bathrooms, and Boffi brand kitchens. In the common areas materials include bamboo wall paneling, stone floors, and white back-lit glass panels. The structural and interior materials are not uncommon in high-end residential projects, but the unconventional form necessitated an innovative approach to methods of construction.
