= New York City Economic Development Corporation =

Public-benefit corporation

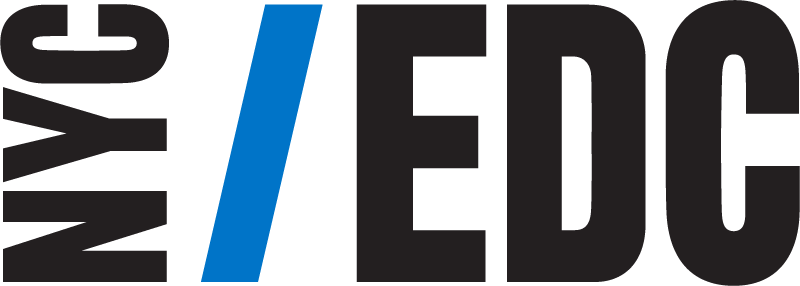
- Predecessor: Public Development Corporation (PDC); Financial Services Corporation (FSC)
- Formation: 1991; 35 years ago
- Type: non-profit economic development corporation
- Headquarters: One Liberty Plaza, New York City, U.S.
- President and CEO: Anthony Shorris
- Budget: $81.7 million (FY 2026)
- Website: edc.nyc

New York City Economic Development Corporation (NYCEDC) is a public-benefit corporation and nonprofit organization that serves as the official economic development corporation for New York City. According to the City of New York and NYCEDC, its mission is to promote economic growth in the five boroughs by strengthening the city's competitive position, encouraging private investment and job creation, and managing City-owned real estate and infrastructure. NYCEDC is organized as a 501(c)(3) not-for-profit corporation and acts as the city's primary vehicle for economic development programs and public–private partnerships.

NYCEDC manages properties and projects on behalf of the City, administers business incentive and financing programs, and supports initiatives in sectors such as technology, life sciences, manufacturing, and the green economy.

== History ==
NYCEDC was created in 1991 through the consolidation of several nonprofit corporations that had been performing economic development functions for the City. One predecessor, the Public Development Corporation (PDC), was established in 1966 to address economic decline by marketing and redeveloping City-owned property and industrial space; its projects included the Brooklyn Army Terminal, Jamaica Center, the South Street Seaport, and pedestrian improvements on Nassau Street. Another predecessor, the Financial Services Corporation (FSC), was formed in 1979 (as the New York City Economic Capital Corporation) to administer government-backed financing programs for business expansion in New York City. The merger that formed NYCEDC followed a review by McKinsey & Company, which recommended reorganizing the City's development entities.

Carl Weisbrod, previously an executive at PDC, served as NYCEDC's first president under Mayor David Dinkins. He was succeeded during the Giuliani administration by Charles Millard and Michael G. Carey, who served as president from 1999 to 2002. In 2002 Mayor Michael Bloomberg appointed banker Andrew Alper as president of NYCEDC. He was followed by Robert C. Lieber, who later became Deputy Mayor for Economic Development and Rebuilding, and by Seth Pinsky, who served as president from 2008 to 2013.

Subsequent presidents have included Kyle Kimball, Maria Torres-Springer, James Patchett and Andrew Kimball.. In July 2026, Mayor Zohran Mamdani appointed Anthony Shorris, former NYC First Deputy Mayor under Bill de Blasio and executive director of the Port Authority of New York and New Jersey, as president and chief executive officer.

=== Applied Sciences NYC ===
One of NYCEDC’s highest-profile initiatives in the early 2010s was Applied Sciences NYC, a competition to establish new applied science and engineering campuses in New York City. In December 2011 the City selected a proposal by Cornell University and the Technion – Israel Institute of Technology to develop a two-million-square-foot campus on Roosevelt Island, now known as Cornell Tech. The Applied Sciences NYC program also supported an engineering campus led by New York University in Downtown Brooklyn and a data science institute at Columbia University.

Impact studies commissioned for the initiative projected that the new campuses would expand graduate engineering enrollment in the city and contribute billions of dollars in economic activity over several decades.

== Governance ==
NYCEDC is organized as a not-for-profit corporation under New York State law and is classified as a local public-benefit corporation. It operates under contract with the City and is not itself a municipal agency.

The Mayor of New York City appoints seven members of the corporation's board of directors, including the chairperson. Ten additional members are appointed by the mayor from nominees submitted by the borough presidents and the Speaker of the New York City Council—one nominated director from each borough president and five from the Speaker. A further ten directors are appointed by the chairperson from a list approved by the mayor. In 2015 Mayor Bill de Blasio announced ten new board appointments, and the size of the board has typically been in the mid-20s, though the exact number of directors has varied over time. (Note: The number of directors is based on counting names in the board list published by NYCEDC. They appear not to be consistent year-over-year.)

In July 2026, Mayor Zohran Mamdani appointed former Federal Trade Commission Chair Lina Khan as chair of the board of directors and Tony Shorris as its chief executive officer.

=== Other entities ===
NYCEDC administers several related entities on behalf of the City. The New York City Industrial Development Agency (NYCIDA) is a public benefit corporation that offers tax-exempt bond financing and other tax benefits intended to encourage companies to retain and create jobs in the City and to support capital investment. The New York City Capital Resource Corporation (NYCCRC), a local development corporation, provides lower-cost financing for capital projects undertaken by eligible nonprofit institutions and manufacturing and industrial businesses.

== Activities and projects ==
NYCEDC's activities include real estate development, planning and infrastructure projects, business and sector development programs, and management of certain transportation and maritime assets for the City. The corporation issues requests for proposals, negotiates and manages ground leases, and oversees capital construction on City-owned sites.

=== Sector and business development ===
NYCEDC implements initiatives to support targeted sectors of the City's economy. Under the LifeSci NYC strategy, the corporation has helped advance projects such as SPARC Kips Bay and Innovation East, life sciences and health-care campuses in Kips Bay approved by the New York City Council in 2025.

The corporation also manages entrepreneurship and inclusive innovation programs. Venture Access NYC and its Founder Fellowship accelerator, launched in 2022, aim to improve access to capital and networks for technology founders from underrepresented backgrounds.

=== Neighborhood and infrastructure projects ===
NYCEDC has played a role in a number of large-scale neighborhood and infrastructure projects across the five boroughs. Examples include:

- Redevelopment and management of the Brooklyn Army Terminal in Sunset Park, including modern industrial and logistics space.
- Planning and investment in the Hunts Point peninsula in the Bronx, including support for modernization of the Hunts Point Produce Market and related food-distribution facilities.
- Work on Essex Crossing and the Seward Park urban renewal area on the Lower East Side of Manhattan.
- Neighborhood initiatives in Coney Island, Sunset Park, 125th Street in Harlem, Downtown Jamaica, Hunter's Point South, and The Hub in the Bronx.
- The High Line park on Manhattan's West Side, where NYCEDC participated in planning and early capital support.
- Redevelopment planning for the historic Kingsbridge Armory in the Bronx, including a community-driven vision approved by the New York City Council in 2025.

NYCEDC also manages and plans waterfront and maritime facilities, including portions of the Brooklyn waterfront and City-owned piers.

=== Waterfront rehabilitation and offshore wind ===
The corporation has been involved in efforts to redevelop industrial waterfront properties and expand public access along the City's shoreline. Projects have included the East River Waterfront Esplanade in Lower Manhattan, as well as maritime freight and ferry infrastructure.

In Sunset Park, NYCEDC is working with partners to transform the South Brooklyn Marine Terminal into one of the largest offshore wind port facilities in the United States, to be used for staging, assembly, and operations and maintenance activities supporting offshore wind projects such as Empire Wind and Beacon Wind.

== Controversies and criticism ==
=== Amazon HQ2 ===
In November 2018 news outlets reported that Amazon was in final negotiations with New York State and New York City to locate one of two new headquarters campuses, known as Amazon HQ2, in Queens West in Long Island City. NYCEDC participated in negotiations over the proposed development and related incentive package.

Amazon confirmed the selection of Long Island City and National Landing in Arlington County, Virginia on November 13, 2018, but on February 14, 2019 the company announced that it would not proceed with the New York campus, citing opposition from some local elected officials and community groups to the scale of subsidies and potential neighborhood impacts.

=== NYC Ferry ===
NYCEDC is the City entity responsible for contracting and overseeing operations of NYC Ferry, the East River and the harbor ferry network launched in 2017. A 2022 audit by New York City Comptroller Brad Lander found that NYCEDC had underreported approximately US$224 million in ferry-related expenditures between 2015 and 2021 and had understated the per-ride subsidy borne by taxpayers. News coverage and watchdog groups cited the findings as evidence of weak oversight and transparency in the program's early years.

In response, NYCEDC agreed to implement several recommendations, including enhanced financial reporting and a new competitive procurement for the ferry operator. The corporation subsequently published supplemental financial information on NYC Ferry operations.
