= Essex Street =

Street in Manhattan, New York

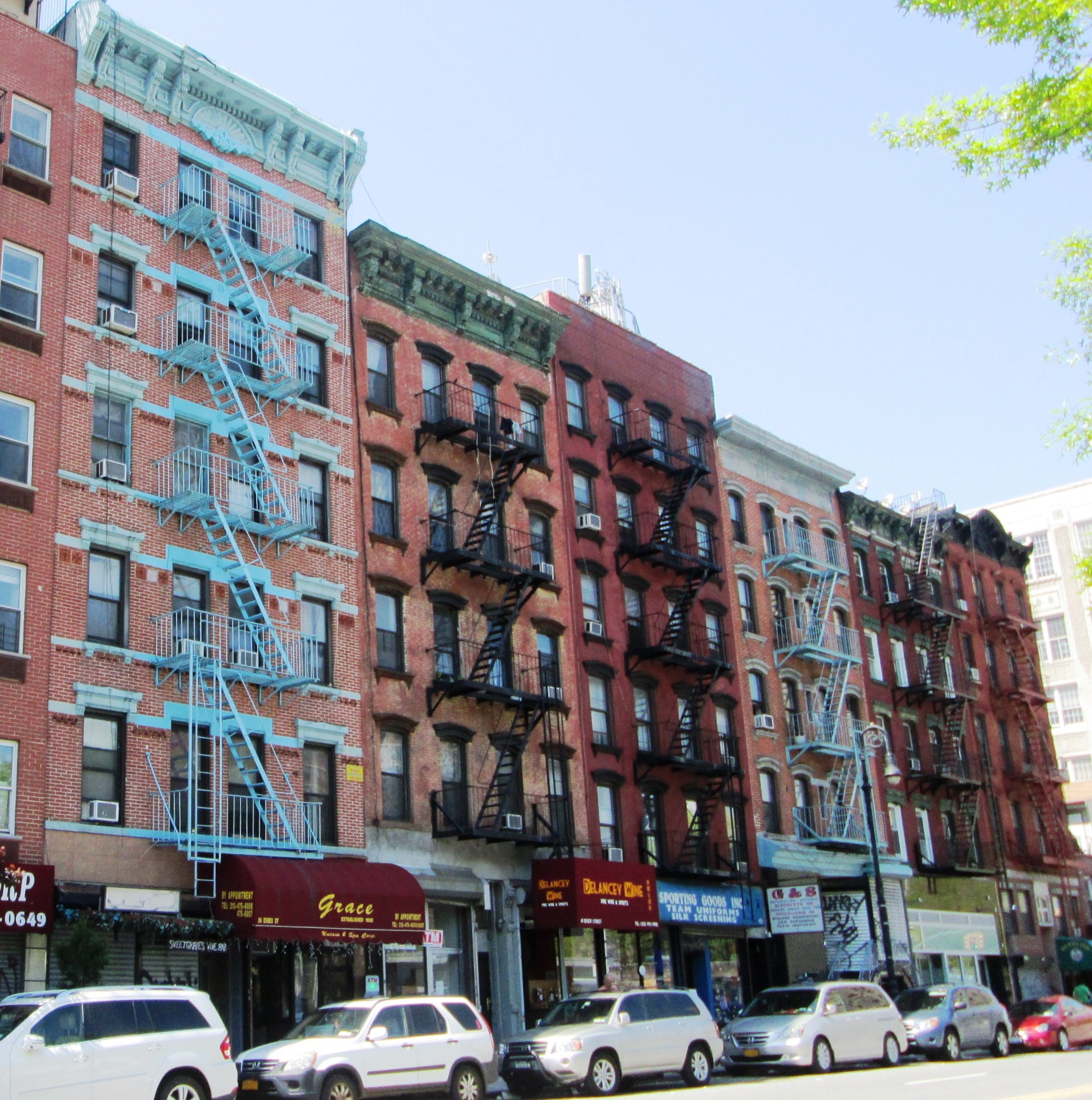
- Tenements on Essex Street between Hester and Grand Streets
- Location: New York City

Essex Street is a north–south street on the Lower East Side of the New York City borough of Manhattan. North of Houston Street, the street becomes Avenue A, which goes north to 14th Street. South of Canal Street it becomes Rutgers Street, the southern end of which is at South Street.

Essex Street was laid out by James Delancey just before the American Revolution as the east side of a "Delancey Square" intended for a genteel ownership. Delancey named the street after the county of Essex in England. Delancey returned to England as a Loyalist in 1775, and the square was developed as building lots.

Long a part of the Lower East Side Jewish enclave, many Jewish-owned stores still operate on the street, including a pickle shop and many Judaica shops. During the late 19th and early 20th century it was sometimes referred to colloquially as 'Pickle Alley'. It is also home to the Essex Street Market.

South of Hester Street, Essex Street is bordered on the east by Seward Park.

== Transportation ==
The Sixth Avenue/Rutgers Street Line of the New York City Subway runs under Essex Street and has stations at Delancey Street (F, <F>, J, M, and Z trains) and East Broadway (F and <F> trains).

The M9 serves Essex Street for its entire length while the M14A+ Select Bus runs on Essex Street north of Grand Street. No bus runs on Rutgers Street but the M22 crosses it on Madison Street.

== Essex Street Market and Essex Crossing ==
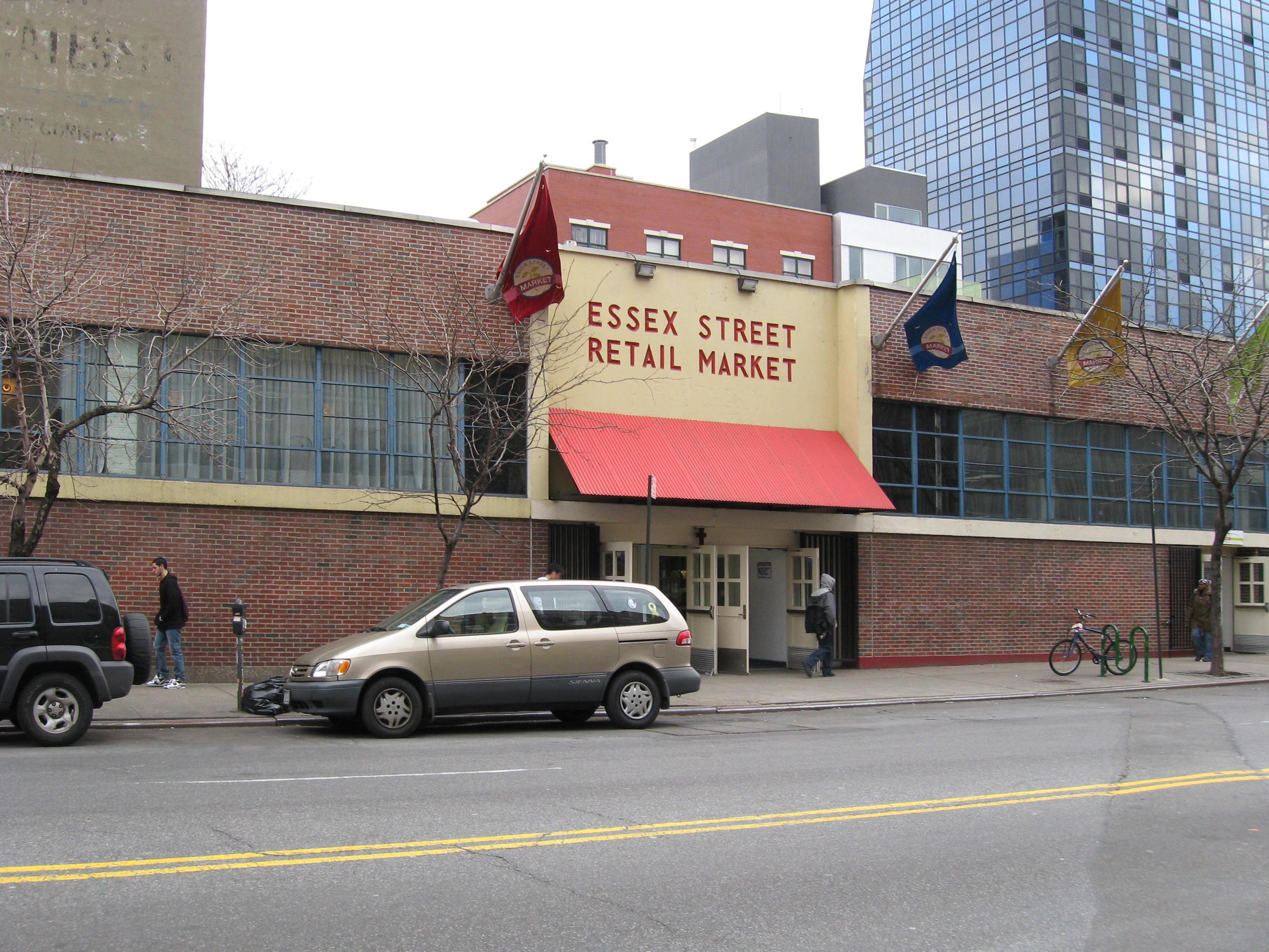
Essex Street Market

The Essex Street Market, constructed in the 1940s, is an indoor retail market that was one of a number of such facilities built in the 1930s under the administration of Mayor Fiorello La Guardia at 120 Essex Street, at Delancey Street. The Essex Street Market is operated and managed by the New York City Economic Development Corporation (NYCEDC).

In September 2013 it was announced that the market would be integrated into Essex Crossing, a $1.1 billion development which began construction in 2015, and which will feature 1,000 low-, moderate- and middle-income apartments, a movie theater, a bowling alley and cultural space. It is expected to be completed in 2024. The old market closed May 5, 2019, and the new location was open by May 13.
