= Seward Park (Manhattan) =

Public park in Manhattan, New York

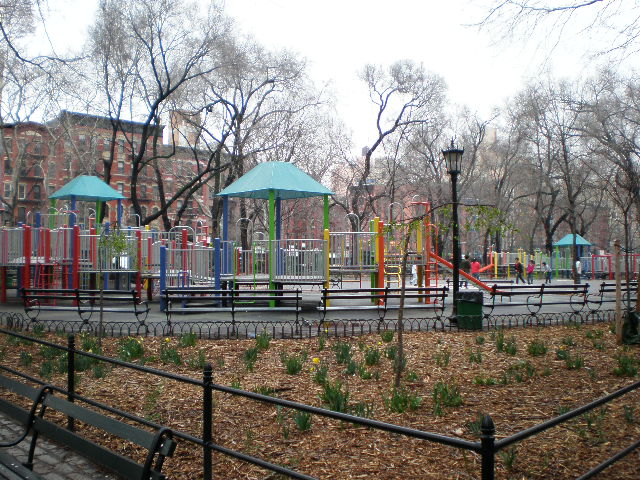
- Playground at Seward Park
- Interactive map of Seward Park
- Location: Bounded by Cooperative Village, East Broadway, and Essex Street, New York, NY 10002
- Nearest city: New York City
- Coordinates: 40°42′53″N 73°59′22″W
- Area: 3.046 acres (12,330 m^{2})
- Created: 1897
- Designer: The Outdoor Recreation League
- Etymology: Named after William Henry Seward
- Operator: NYC Parks
- Open: 1903
- Status: Open
- Website: NYC Parks website

Seward Park is a public park and playground on the Lower East Side of Manhattan, New York City. Located north of East Broadway and east of Essex Street, it is 3.046 acres (12,330 m^{2}) in size and is the first municipally built playground in the United States.

== History ==
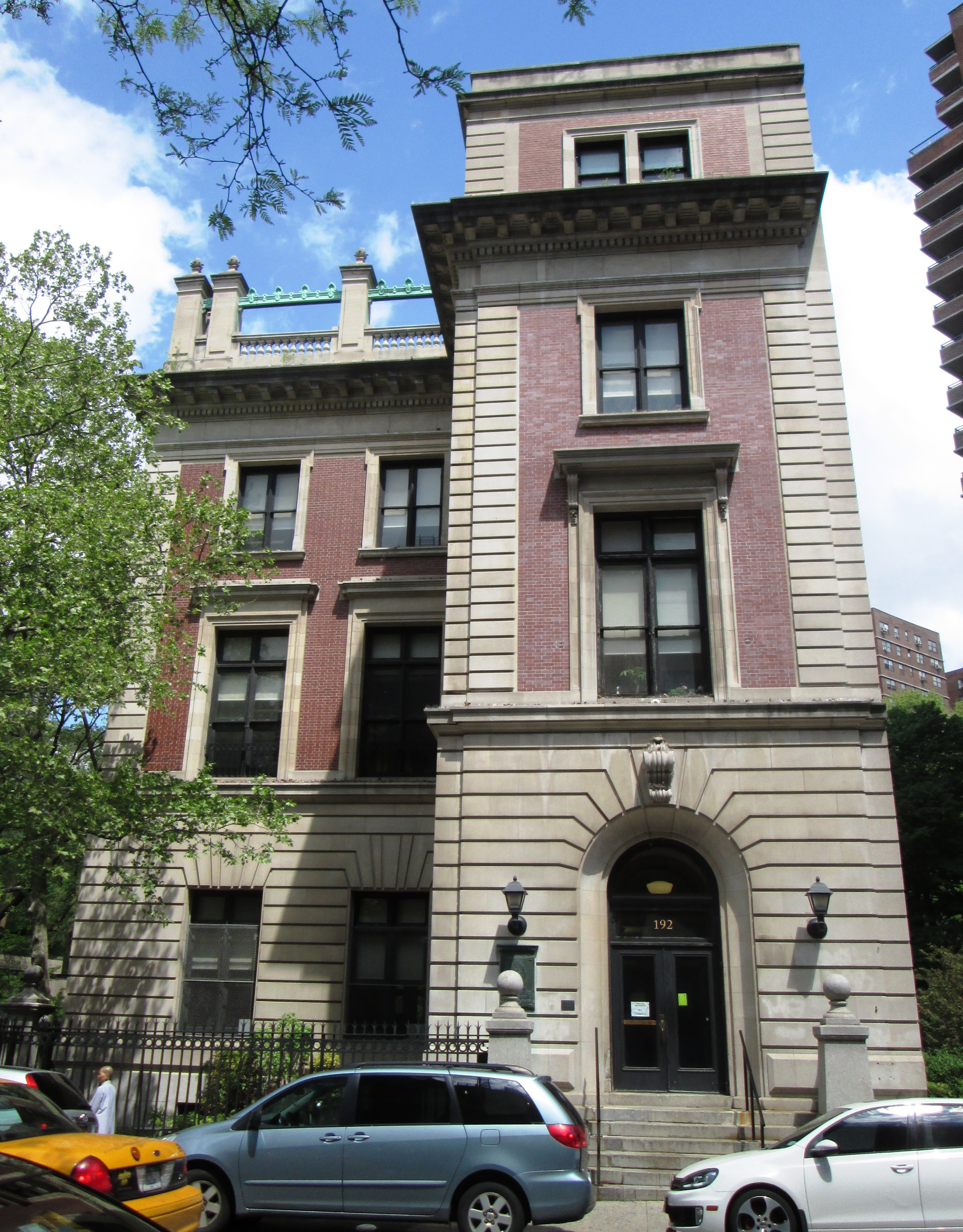
The Seward Park Branch of the New York Public Library

The park is named for William Henry Seward, a U.S. Senator from New York who served from 1849 to 1861 and later went on to be Secretary of State in the Lincoln administration. The park was built on a condemned piece of property purchased in 1897. New York City lacked the funds to do anything with it, so the Outdoor Recreation League (ORL), a playground and recreation advocacy group that built playgrounds in the undeveloped parks using temporary facilities and equipment, built it as the first permanent, municipally built playground in the country.

Opened on October 17, 1903, it was built with cinder surfacing, fences, a recreation pavilion, and children's play and gymnastic equipment. A large running track encircled the play area and children's garden.

The Seward Park Branch of the New York Public Library was built in the southeastern part of the park, opening on November 11, 1909.

In the 1930s and 1940s, the park was reconstructed, and a piece of land was returned to the city. The Schiff Fountain, donated by Jacob H. Schiff, was moved from a nearby park and placed in the park. In 1999, Seward Park was renovated again, and some of the original 1903 plans were restored.

This renovation introduced a mosaic map of the surrounding neighborhood, with the park depicted in the center of the circular map, which has a spray shower.

Seward Park also holds one of the few statues in the U.S. dedicated to Togo, the sled dog who led the most treacherous route of the 1925 serum run to Nome, Alaska.

== See also ==
- 10-minute walk
- Park conservancy
- Seward Park Housing Corporation
