= Beth Hamedrash Hagodol =

Synagogue in Manhattan, New York

Beth Hamedrash Hagodol (Norfolk Street Baptist Church)
- Hebrew: בֵּית הַמִּדְרָש הַגָּדוֹל
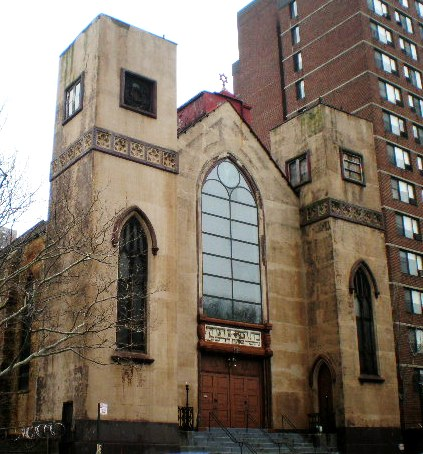
- Beth Hamedrash Hagodol façade in 2008, before the 2017 fire and subsequent demolition

- Location in Lower Manhattan

Religion
- Affiliation: Orthodox Judaism (former)
- Ecclesiastical or organisational status: Church (1850 – 1887); Synagogue (1887 – 2007); Abandoned (from 2007)
- Status: Demolished

Location
- Location: 60–64 Norfolk Street, Lower East Side, Manhattan, New York City, New York
- Country: United States
- Coordinates: 40°43′01″N 73°59′16″W

Architecture
- Architects: Unknown; Schneider & Herter
- Type: Church
- Style: Gothic Revival
- Founder: Rabbi Abraham Joseph Ash
- Established: 1852 (as Beth Hamedrash congregation)
- Groundbreaking: 1848
- Completed: 1850; 176 years ago
- Demolished: May 14, 2017

Specifications
- Direction of façade: West
- Capacity: 1,200
- Materials: Foundation: brownstone; Walls: brick, stucco over brick
- Beth Hamedrash Hagodol
- U.S. National Register of Historic Places
- NRHP reference No.: 99001438
- Added to NRHP: November 30, 1999

Beth Hamedrash Hagodol (Hebrew: בֵּית הַמִּדְרָש הַגָּדוֹל, lit. 'Great Study House') was an Orthodox Jewish congregation that for over 120 years was located in a historic building at 60–64 Norfolk Street between Grand and Broome Streets on the Lower East Side of Manhattan, New York City. It was the first Eastern European congregation founded in New York City and the oldest Russian Jewish Orthodox congregation in the United States.

Founded in 1852 by Rabbi Abraham Joseph Ash as Beth Hamedrash, the congregation split in 1859, with the rabbi and most of the members renaming their congregation Beth Hamedrash Hagodol. The congregation's president and a small number of the members eventually formed the nucleus of Kahal Adath Jeshurun, also known as the Eldridge Street Synagogue. Rabbi Jacob Joseph, the first and only Chief Rabbi of New York City, led the congregation from 1888 to 1902. Rabbi Ephraim Oshry, one of the few European Jewish legal decisors to survive the Holocaust, led the congregation from 1952 to 2003.

The congregation's building, a Gothic Revival structure built in 1850 as the Norfolk Street Baptist Church and purchased in 1885, was one of the largest synagogues on the Lower East Side. It was listed on the National Register of Historic Places in 1999. In the late 20th century the congregation dwindled and was unable to maintain the building, which had been damaged by storms. Despite their obtaining funding and grants, the structure was critically endangered.

The synagogue was closed in 2007. The congregation, reduced to around 20 regularly attending members, was sharing facilities with a congregation on Henry Street. The Lower East Side Conservancy was trying to raise an estimated $4.5 million for repairs of the building, with the intent of converting it to an educational center. In December the leadership of the synagogue under Rabbi Mendel Greenbaum filed a “hardship application” with the Landmarks Preservation Commission seeking permission to demolish the building to make way for a new residential development. This application was withdrawn in March 2013, but the group Friends of the Lower East Side described Beth Hamedrash Hagodol's status as "demolition by neglect". The abandoned synagogue was "largely destroyed" by a "suspicious" three-alarm fire on May 14, 2017.

== Early history ==
Beth Hamedrash Hagodol was founded by Eastern European Jews in 1852 as Beth Hamedrash (literally "House of Study", but used colloquially in Yiddish as the term for a synagogue). The founding rabbi, Abraham Joseph Ash, was born in Siemiatycze (then in Congress Poland) in 1813 or 1821. He immigrated to New York City in 1851 or 1852. The first Eastern European Orthodox rabbi to serve in the United States, Ash "rejected the reformist tendencies of the German Jewish congregations" there. He soon organized a minyan (prayer quorum) of like-minded Polish Jews, and by 1852 began conducting services. Though the membership consisted mostly of Polish Jews, it also included "Lithuanians, two Germans, and an Englishman." For the first six years of the congregation's existence, Ash was not paid for his work as rabbi and instead earned a living as a peddler.

The congregation moved frequently in its early years: in 1852 it was located at 83 Bayard Street, then at Elm and Canal, and from 1853 to 1856 in a hall at Pearl between Chatham and Centre Streets. In 1856, with the assistance of the philanthropist Sampson Simson and wealthy Sephardi Jews who sympathized with the traditionalism of the congregation's members, the congregation purchased a Welsh chapel on Allen Street. The synagogue, which had "a good Hebrew library", was a place both of prayer and study, included a rabbinic family court, and, according to historian and long-time member Judah David Eisenstein, "rapidly became the most important center for Orthodox Jewish guidance in the country."

Synagogue dues were collected by the shamash (the equivalent of a sexton or beadle), who augmented his salary by working as a glazier and running a small food concession stand in the vestibule. There mourners who came to recite kaddish could purchase a piece of sponge cake and small glass of brandy for ten cents (today $3.60).

Beth Hamedrash was the prototypical American synagogue for early immigrant Eastern European Jews, who began entering the United States in large numbers only in the 1870s. They found the synagogues of the German Jewish immigrants who preceded them to be unfamiliar, both religiously and culturally. Russian Jews in particular had been more excluded from Russian society than were German Jews from German society, for both linguistic and social reasons. Unlike German Jews, the Jews who founded Beth Hamedrash viewed both religion and the synagogue as central to their lives. They attempted to re-create in Beth Hamedrash the kind of synagogue they had belonged to in Europe.

== Schism ==
In 1859, disagreement broke out between Ash and the synagogue's parnas (president) Joshua Rothstein over who had been responsible for procuring the Allen Street location, and escalated into a conflict "over the question of official authority and 'honor'". Members took sides in the dispute, which led to synagogue disturbances, a contested election, and eventually to Ash's taking Rothstein to a United States court to try to oust him as president of the congregation. After the court rejected Ash's arguments, a large majority of members left with Ash to form Beth Hamedrash Hagodol ("Great House of Study"), adding the word "Hagodol" ("Great") to the original name.

The followers of Rothstein stayed at the Allen Street location and retained the name "Beth Hamedrash" until the mid-1880s. With membership and financial resources both severely reduced, they were forced to merge with Congregation Holche Josher Wizaner; the combined congregation adopted the name "Kahal Adath Jeshurun", and built the Eldridge Street Synagogue.

According to Eisenstein, Beth Hamedrash Hagodol provided an atmosphere that was "socially religious", in which Jews "combine[d] piety with pleasure; they call[ed] their shule a shtibl or prayer-club room; they desire[d] to be on familiar terms with the Almighty and abhor[red] decorum; they want[ed] everyone present to join and chant the prayers; above all they scorn[ed] a regularly ordained cantor." In contrast to the informality of the services, members scrupulously observed the Jewish dietary laws, and every member personally oversaw the baking of his matzos for use on Passover.

The congregation initially moved to the top floor of a building at the corner of Grand and Forsyth Streets, and in 1865 moved again, to a former courthouse on Clinton Street. In 1872, the congregation built a synagogue at Ludlow and Hester Streets. There the congregation's younger members gained greater control and introduced some minor innovations; for example, changing the title of parnas to president, and in 1877 hiring a professional cantor—Judah Oberman—for $500 (today $15,100) per year, to bring greater formality and decorum to the services as well as to attract new members. While somewhat "Americanized", in general the congregation remained quite traditional. Men and women sat separately, the full service in the traditional prayer book was followed, and the congregation still trained men for rabbinic ordination. Additionally, Talmud and Mishna study groups, founded in the 1870s, were held both mornings and evenings.

Ash had only served as Beth Hamedrash Hagodol's rabbi intermittently during this time; during the American Civil War he had briefly been a successful manufacturer of hoop skirts, before losing his money, and returning to the rabbinate. Congregants had a number of issues with him, including his outside business ventures and an alleged inclination towards Hasidism. The more learned members of the congregation contested his scholarship. Ash resigned as rabbi in 1877, and in 1879, directors of Beth Hamedrash Hagodol proposed that a Chief Rabbi be hired for New York. A number of New York City synagogues formed the "United Hebrew Orthodox Congregations", and agreed to select the Malbim (Meïr Leibush ben Jehiel Michel Weiser) for the role. The appointment was announced in Philadelphia's Jewish Record, but the Malbim never filled the position. Beth Hamedrash Hagodol re-hired Ash to fill the vacant role of congregational rabbi at a salary of $25 per month (or $300—today $10,000—per year). The following year the congregation hired a new cantor, Simhe Samuelson, for $1,000 (today $35,000) a year, over three times Ash's salary.

== Norfolk Street building ==
The congregation's building at 60-64 Norfolk Street, between Grand Street and Broome Street on the Lower East Side, had originally been the Norfolk Street Baptist Church. Founded in 1841 when the Stanton Street Baptist Church congregation split, the members had first worshiped in an existing church building at Norfolk and Broome. In 1848 they officially incorporated and began construction of a new building, which was dedicated in January 1850.

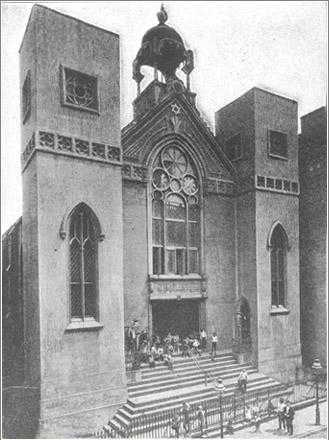
Beth Hamedrash Hagodol at the beginning of the 20th century

Largely unchanged, the structure was designed in the Gothic Revival style by an unknown architect, with masonry-bearing walls with timber framing at the roof and floors, and brownstone foundation walls and exterior door and window trim. The front facade (west, on Norfolk Street) is "stuccoed and scored to simulate smooth-faced ashlar", though the other elevations are faced in brick. Window tracery was all in wood. Much of the original work remains on the side elevations. Characteristically Gothic exterior features include "vertical proportions, pointed arched window openings with drip moldings, three bay facade with towers". Gothic interior features include "ribbed vaulting" and a "tall and lofty rectangular nave and apse." Originally the window over the main door was a circular rose window, and the two front towers had crenellations in tracery, instead of the present plain tops. The square windows below are original, but the former quatrefoil wooden tracery is gone in many cases. The bandcourse of quatrefoil originally extended across the center section of the facade.

Even as the building was under construction, the ethnic makeup of the church's neighborhood was rapidly changing; native-born Baptists were displaced by Irish and German immigrants. As members moved uptown, the congregation decided to follow and sold their building in 1860 to Alanson T. Biggs, a successful local merchant. The departing Baptist congregation founded the Fifth Avenue Baptist church, then founded the Park Avenue Church, and finally built the Riverside Church.

Biggs converted the church to one for Methodists, and in 1862, transferred ownership to the Alanson Methodist Episcopal Church. The Methodist congregation was successful for a time, with membership peaking at 572 members in 1873. It declined after that, and the church ran into financial difficulties. In 1878 the congregation transferred ownership to the New York City Church Extension and Missionary Society of the Methodist Episcopal Church.

Founded in 1866, the Church Extension and Missionary Society's mission was "... to promote Churches, Missions, and Sunday-schools in the City of New York." It built or supported Methodist churches primarily in poor areas, or areas that were being developed, including one in the building that would later house the First Roumanian-American congregation. Soon after its purchase of the Norfolk Street building, the Church Extension and Missionary Society discovered that the neighborhood had become mostly Jewish and German. By 1884, it realized "the church was too big and costly to maintain", and put it up for sale.

In 1885 Beth Hamedrash Hagodol purchased the building for $45,000 (today $1.6 million), and made alterations and repairs at a cost of $10,000 (today $360,000), but made no external modifications by the re-opening. Alterations to the interior were generally made to adapt it to synagogue use. These included the additions of an Ark to hold the Torah scrolls (replacing the original pulpit), an "eternal light" in front of the ark, and a bimah (a central elevated platform where the Torah scrolls are read). At some time a women's gallery was added round three sides of the nave. Interior redecorations included sanctuary ceilings that were "painted a bright blue, studded with stars".

In addition to attracting new and wealthy members, the congregation intended the substantial building to garner prestige and respectability for the relatively new immigrant Jews from Eastern Europe, and to show that Jews on the Lower East Side could be just as "civilized" as the reform-minded Jews of uptown Manhattan. For this reason, a number of other Lower East Side congregations also purchased or built new buildings around this time. They also hired increasingly expensive cantors until, in 1886, Kahal Adath Jeshurun hired P. Minkowsy for the "then-staggering sum of five thousand dollars per annum" (today $179,000). Beth Hamedrash Hagodol responded by recruiting from Europe the famous and highly paid cantor Israel Michaelowsky (or Michalovsky). By 1888 Beth Hamedrash Hagodol's members included "several bankers, lawyers, importers and wholesale merchants, besides a fair sprinkling of the American element."

Though the building had undergone previous alterations—for example, the Church Extension and Missionary Society had "removed deteriorated parapets from the towers" in 1880—it did not undergo significant renovations until the early 1890s. That year the rose window on the front of the building was removed, "possibly because it had Christian motifs", and replaced with a large arched window, still in keeping with the Gothic style. The work was undertaken by the architectural firm of (Ernest) Schneider & (Henry) Herter, German immigrants who had worked on a number of other synagogues, including the Park East Synagogue. In 1893 they fixed "serious structural problems", the consequence of neglected maintenance. The work included "stabiliz[ing] the front steps, add[ing] brick buttresses to the sides of the church for lateral support, again in a Gothic style, and replac[ing] the original basement columns with six-inch cast iron columns." A later renovation replaced the wooden stairs from the main floor to the basement with iron ones.

Two Stars of David were added to the center of the facade. One is seen in the old photograph (above left), over a palmette ornament at the top of the window arch. The other, mounted above the top of the gable, remains visible in the modern photograph (top). The unusual cupola-like structure on legs seen above the gable in the old photograph, now gone, was also added by the synagogue, as was the square structure on which it sat. The panel with a large Hebrew inscription over the main doors was added in this period, before the older photograph. The decorations to the upper parts of the central section of the facade survived until at least 1974, as did the tracery to the square windows on the towers; this Gothic ornamentation was removed after it deteriorated.

== Jacob Joseph era ==
Ash died in 1887, and the United Hebrew Orthodox Congregations (now called The Association of American Orthodox Hebrew Congregations) began a search for a successor, to serve as rabbi of Beth Hamedrash Hagodol and as Chief Rabbi of New York City. This search was opposed by Rabbi Henry Pereira Mendes, of Congregation Shearith Israel. Mendes felt that the money and energy would be better spent on supporting the Jewish Theological Seminary of America (JTSA), which he had co-founded with Sabato Morais in 1886. In his view, training American-born rabbis at the Seminary would be a much more effective means of fighting the growing strength of American Reform Judaism: these native English-speaking rabbis would appeal to the younger generation far more than imported, Yiddish-speaking ones.

The Association of American Orthodox Hebrew Congregations rejected Morais's position, and offered the role to a number of "leading East European Orthodox rabbis", all of whom turned it down. They eventually narrowed the field to two candidates, Zvi Rabinovitch and Jacob Joseph. Although Rabinovitch received "massive support" from "leading east European rabbis", the congregation hired Jacob Joseph as the first—and what would turn out to be only—Chief Rabbi of New York City.

Born in Kroz, Lithuania, Joseph had studied in the Volozhin yeshiva under Naftali Zvi Yehuda Berlin; he was known there as Rav Yaakov Charif ("Rabbi Jacob Sharp") because of his sharp mind. He was one of the main disciples of Yisroel Salanter, and in 1883 had been appointed the maggid (preacher) of Vilna. Beth Hamedrash Hagodol, the Eldridge Street Synagogue, and 13 other Lower East Side synagogues had raised $2,500 (today $90,000) towards the creation of a European style kehilla to oversee New York's Orthodox community, and had imported Joseph in an attempt to achieve that (ultimately unfulfilled) goal. Joseph's salary was to be the then-substantial $2,500 per year, "with an additional $1000 for rent, furnishings, and utilities". Though Joseph's appointment was, in part, intended to bring prestige to the downtown Orthodox congregations, his primary task as Chief Rabbi was to bring order and regulation to New York's chaotic kosher slaughtering industry.

Joseph arrived in New York on July 7, 1888, and later that month preached his inaugural Sabbath sermon at Beth Hamedrash Hagodol. The speech attracted a huge crowd, with over 1,500 men crowded into the sanctuary, and thousands more outside. The police had to call extra reinforcements to control the throng, and to escort Joseph into the synagogue. Though he had been chosen, in part, for his "fabulous skills as an orator", his speaking style and sermons, which had been so beloved in Europe, did not impress New York audiences. According to Abraham Cahan, "[S]ome of the very people who drank in his words thirstily in Vilna left the synagogue in the middle of his sermon here."

In October 1888, Joseph made his first significant statement as Chief Rabbi. He issued new regulations for New York's Jewish poultry business, in an attempt to bring it into accordance with Jewish law. The funds for supporting the agency supervising adherence to these regulations were to be raised through an increase in the price of meat and chicken. The affected vendors and consumers, however, refused to pay this levy. They likened it to the korobka, a tax on meat in Russia they despised, and "organized a mass meeting in January 1889 against 'the imported rabbi'". Joseph never succeeded in organizing the kosher meat business.

Joseph was also unable to stop those who came to hear him speak from desecrating the Sabbath, and his Yiddish sermons had no impact on the younger generation. In addition, he had to contend with a number of obstacles: he had no administrative experience or training, local Orthodox rabbis (particularly Joshua Seigel) and Jews outside his congregation did not accept his authority, and non-Orthodox Jews and groups criticized him. These problems were exacerbated by a stroke suffered in 1895, which partially incapacitated him, followed by a relapse in 1900 which left him bedridden.

In the late 19th century, other synagogues in New York City often served a particular constituency, typically Jews from a single town in Russia, Poland, or Romania. Beth Hamedrash Hagodol prided itself in welcoming and assisting all Jews, regardless of origins. The synagogue's Passover Relief Committee—dedicated to providing funds and food to poor Jews so that they could properly celebrate the holiday of Passover—stated "In dispensing money and matzos to the poor, all are recognized as the children of one Father, and no lines are drawn between natives of different countries." By the turn of the 20th century, Beth Hamedrash Hagodol was distributing approximately $800 (today $31,000) a year to the poor for Passover supplies, compared to a total synagogue income of around $5,000 (today $194,000). This was on top of its average $15 (today $600) weekly contributions to the poor, and those of individual congregational members of around $2,000 (today $77,000) per annum. By 1901, annual revenues were around $6,000 (today $232,000), and the congregation had 150 members.

During Joseph's tenure, Beth Hamedrash Hagodol helped found the Union of Orthodox Jewish Congregations of America (the "Orthodox Union"). In the spring of 1898, 50 lay officials from a number of Orthodox New York synagogues—including Congregation Ohab Zedek, the Eldridge Street Synagogue, Congregation Shearith Israel and Beth Hamedrash Hagodol—convened to create the organization. By the 1980s the Orthodox Union had over 1,000 member congregations.

Joseph served as the synagogue's rabbi from his arrival in the United States in 1888 until his death in 1902 at age 62. During this time, his family slipped into poverty, as he did not receive his salary, which had been based on the anticipated taxes on kosher meats and vendors, and on matzos. After his death, Beth Hamedrash Hagodol secured the right to bury him in its cemetery by promising his widow $1,500 (today $56,000) and a monthly $15 stipend; in turn, individuals offered the congregation large sums—$5,000 (today $186,000) in one case—for the right to be buried near him. His funeral was attended by up to 100,000 mourners, "clouded by the guilt-driven attempt of New York's Orthodox Jews to honor him for the last time, as partial compensation for the way they treated him during his life."

== Post-Joseph era ==
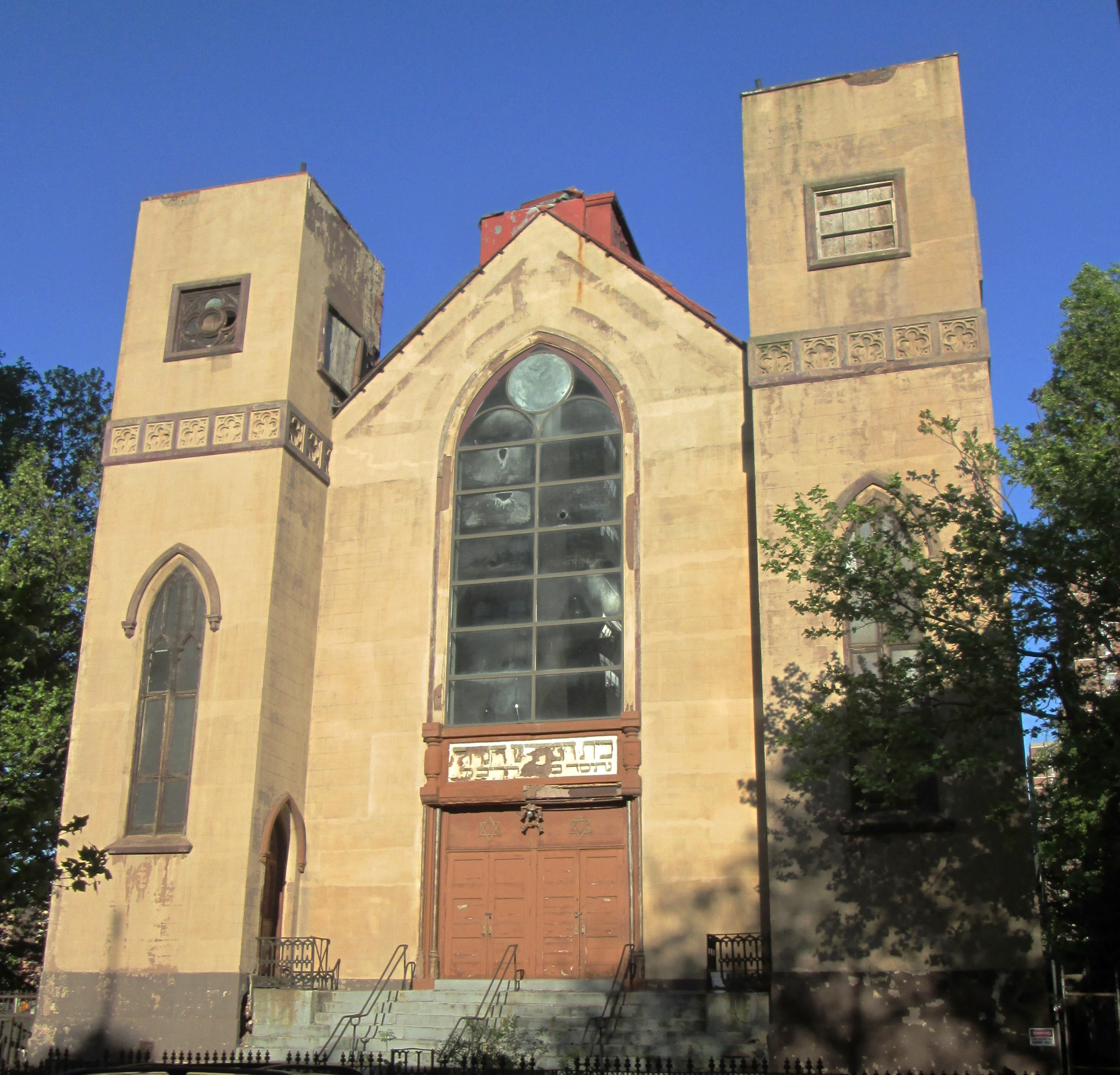
Beth Hamedrash Hagodol in 2013

Joseph was succeeded by Rabbi Shalom Elchanan Jaffe, a founder of the Union of Orthodox Rabbis and a strong supporter of the Rabbi Isaac Elchanan Theological Seminary. Jaffe, who was born near Vilna, had, like Joseph, studied at the Volozhin yeshiva, and had received his rabbinic ordination from Naftali Zvi Yehuda Berlin and Yitzchak Elchanan Spektor. The author of several books of religious commentary, Jaffe was an influential rabbi on the Lower East Side, in part because of his authority over kosher supervision of New York's butcher stores and slaughterhouses, a position that often brought him into conflict with Rabbi Gavriel Zev Margolis, who led competing kashrut efforts. He was also a strong anti-Zionist and "rejoiced when Herzl died".

Harry Fischel was the congregation's Vice President until 1902; there he first met and eventually attended the Bar Mitzvah of his future son-in-law, Herbert S. Goldstein. Goldstein, who was ordained by Jaffe at the JTSA, founded the Institutional Synagogue in Harlem. He is the only person to have been president of the Union of Orthodox Jewish Congregations of America, the Rabbinical Council of America (first presidium), and the Synagogue Council of America. It was in response to an April 1929 telegram from Goldstein, asking if Albert Einstein believed in God, that Einstein stated, "I believe in Spinoza's God, who reveals himself in the lawful harmony of the world, not in a God who concerns himself with the fate and actions of human beings."

Beth Hamedrash Hagodol had 175 member families by 1908, and the synagogue's annual revenues were $10,000 (today $350,000). In 1909, the synagogue was the site of a mass meeting to protest the 20th Central Conference of American Rabbis, described as "the malicious misrepresentation of Judaism by the so-called reformed rabbis in conference in this city", and in 1913 the synagogue was the site of a "historic mass meeting" to raise funds for the first Young Israel synagogue, at which Jacob Schiff was the guest speaker. Membership had fallen to 110 families by 1919.

Dr. Benjamin Fleischer, a noted orator, was elected rabbi of Beth Hamedrash Hagodol in September 1924. While serving as the congregation's rabbi he published his 1938 philosophical work Revaluation. Miscellaneous essays, lectures and discourses on Jewish religious philosophy, ethics and history and his 1941 military history From Dan To Megiddo. In May 1939, he and two other rabbis (and a fourth rabbi as secretary) formed the first permanent beth din (court of Jewish law) in the U.S.

In the early-to-mid-20th century the congregation's financial footing was still not sound; though the Norfolk Street building had been purchased in 1885 for $45,000 (and $10,000 in alterations and repairs), in 1921 it still owed $40,000 (today $720,000) on the mortgage. Additional costs were incurred by work done on the building; two years earlier, architect George Dress had rearranged the toilet facilities, in 1934 architect Philip Bardes designed a small brick extension at the building's south-east corner, and in the 1930s or 1940s the walls and four of the five spandrels in the sanctuary interior were painted with colorful "Eastern European-inspired" pictures and murals of Jerusalem and "Holy Land landscapes and Biblical scenes". At the end of December 1946, then-president Abraham Greenwald stated that unless $35,000 (today $580,000) were immediately raised for the repair of the building, it would have to be demolished.

Ephraim Oshry, noted Torah scholar and religious leader in the Kovno Ghetto, and one of the few European Jewish legal decisors to survive The Holocaust, became the synagogue's rabbi in 1952, a post he retained for over 50 years. During the Holocaust the Nazis had made him the custodian of a warehouse that stored Jewish books intended for an exhibit of "artifacts of the extinct Jewish race". He used the books to help him write responsa, answering questions asked of him regarding how Jews could live their lives in accordance with Jewish law under the extreme conditions imposed by the Nazis. He also ran "secret nightly worship services", and helped Jews bake matzah for Passover, under threat of death if discovered. After the war he founded a yeshiva for Jewish orphans in Italy, and then another religious school in Montreal, before moving to New York to take up the position of rabbi at Beth Hamedrash Hagodol. There, his Sunday afternoon lectures were so popular that the entire 1,200-seat sanctuary was filled, and the overflow had to sit on the stairs. While rabbi of Beth Hamedrash Hagodol, he founded another yeshiva in Monsey, New York, for gifted high school aged boys.

The congregation's building was again threatened with demolition in 1967, but Oshry, possibly the first Lower East Side rabbi to recognize the value of landmark designation, was successful in having it designated a New York City landmark, thus saving it. At that time the congregation claimed 1,400 members.

In 1974, the New York City Landmarks Preservation Commission applied to have the building added to the National Register of Historic Places, and considered significant at the state level; on the application the building's condition was described as "excellent". The case was reviewed on June 19, 1974, and the site was deemed ineligible. The building was repainted and repaired in 1977.

== Late 1990s to present ==
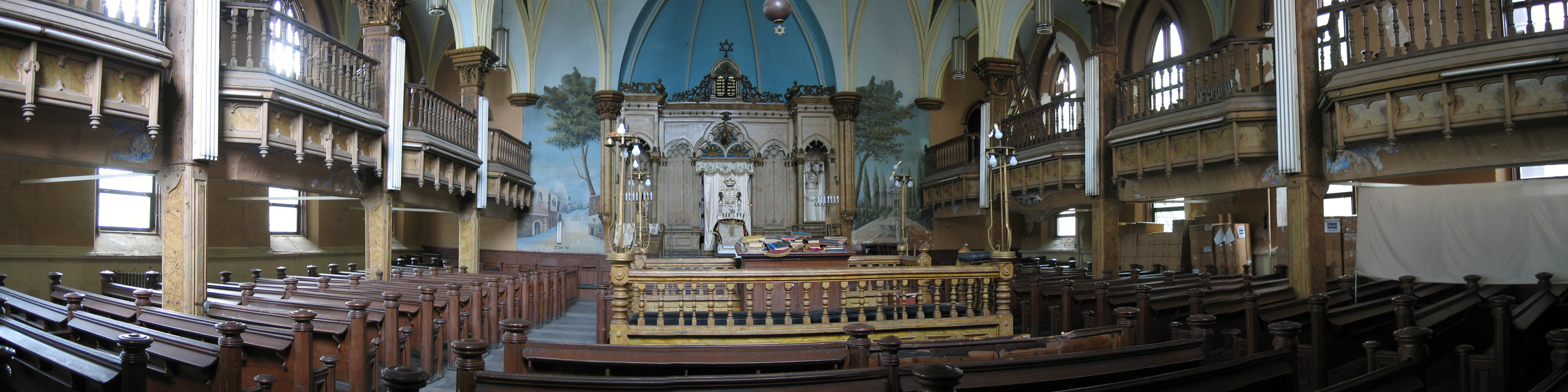
Beth Hamedrash Hagodol sanctuary in 2005

In the summer of 1997, a storm blew out the main two-story window at the front of the building, and the window's wooden frame was rotten, cracked and could not be saved. The window remained unrepaired, which left the sanctuary open to the elements for a month before the congregation, down to approximately 100 members, asked for assistance. The congregants had, by then, long held services in a smaller room, using the sanctuary only on the High Holidays. The New York Landmarks Conservancy's Endangered Buildings fund gave $2,500 for a temporary metal window, and assisted in getting approval from the Landmarks Preservation Commission for the work required to repair the damage, but the congregation did not have the $10,000 required to pay for it. Beth Hamedrash Hagodol received an additional $2,000 from the New York Landmarks Conservancy's Sacred Sites program in 1998 for a conditions survey. In 1999 a second application for National Historical designation was made, this time successful; the building was deemed significant at the local level, and was added to the National Register of Historic Places on November 30.

The congregation raised $40,000 in 2000 for emergency repairs, and was awarded a $230,000 grant by the New York State Office of Parks, Recreation and Historic Preservation for restoration work, including roof repair, but had not been able to raise the matching funds required to receive the grant. On December 6, 2001, a fire and subsequent fire-fighting efforts severely damaged the roof, ceiling, mural paintings and decorative plasterwork.

The National Trust for Historic Preservation designated the building an endangered historic site in 2003, the only synagogue on the list. It still retained a number of significant architectural features, including "the ornate ark and pulpit, central bimah (reader's platform) with etched glass lamps, cantilevered balconies, Gothic vaulted ceiling, and colorful wall paintings"; the lighting included "converted gas fixtures". Features retained from the original construction included Gothic Revival style woodwork and cast-iron railing that follows the lot line, and the original wooden pews. That same year Oshry died. His successor—designated by Oshry himself—was his son-in-law, Rabbi Mendl Greenbaum.

By 2006, $1 million of an estimated required $3.5 million had been raised for repairs to the structure. In 2007, Greenbaum made the decision to shut the synagogue down, as its membership had dwindled to around 15. The building was mostly closed to the public as its damaged interior was considered a hazard for visitors. The synagogue, "the home of the oldest Orthodox congregation continuously housed in a single location in New York" sat "padlocked and empty" with holes in the roof and plaster falling from the ceiling. In 2011, the Buildings Department issued a vacate order.

Reportedly, the Lower East Side Conservancy was trying to raise an estimate $4.5 million for repairs, with the intent of turning the building into an educational center. It was granted $215,000 by the United States Department of Education and was promised an equal amount by the Lower Manhattan Development Corporation. Several years earlier the Conservancy had also been promised a total of $980,000 from New York State, the City Council, Mayor Bloomberg, and the Manhattan Borough President's office, but had yet to receive most of the city funds. The group was also trying to raise $400,000 from private donors for the first phase of the renovation, which would secure the structure and roof. Led by Greenbaum, Beth Hamedrash Hagodol was down to around 20 regularly attending members, and was sharing facilities with a congregation on Henry Street.

By the end of 2012 at least a million dollars in grants for repairs to the building had gone unused and were rescinded. In December 2012 the leadership of the synagogue under Greenbaum filed a “hardship application” with the Landmarks Preservation Commission seeking permission to demolish the building to make way for a new residential development. In place of the synagogue, Greenbaum envisioned a 45,000 square feet (4,200 m^{2}) condo building with room for a small synagogue on the ground floor, and possibly a kollel. This application was withdrawn—at least temporarily—in March 2013, but the group Friends of the Lower East Side described Beth Hamedrash Hagodol's status as "demolition by neglect".

=== 2017 fire ===
On May 14, 2017, shortly after 7 p.m., a three-alarm fire broke out in the unused synagogue after what an eyewitness called a "big explosion". The fire was brought under control at around midnight by approximately 150 firefighters—who, during the fire, allowed Rabbi Yehuda Oshry, the son of Ephraim Oshry, to rescue the Torah scrolls—but not before it "largely destroyed" the structure. A day later, the fire was said to seem "suspicious" due to surveillance video that showed three young people running from the area just before the fire broke out. The fire brought down the ceiling and walls of the synagogue, creating a 15-foot (4.6 m) pile of rubble. On May 17, three days after the fire, a 14-year-old boy was arrested and charged with setting the fire; the boy's two companions were questioned and released, although they are considered to be witnesses. The Fire Department's investigation into how the fire was started was being held up by the need to install supports in order to safely enter the building. By mid-June, the city's Legal Department was still investigating, and prosecutors had not charged the boy who had been arrested.

In the aftermath of the fire, the synagogue took steps for the possible demolition of the building. The city's New York City Department of Buildings (DOB) had determined that the remains of the building was unstable, but would not approve an emergency demolition, so a board member filed an application with the New York City Landmark Preservation Commission (LPC) for a general demolition permit, which did not specify how much of the structure was planned to be razed; that would depend on a determination of "structural findings". The synagogue also provided materials to Manhattan Community Board 3, with a request that their application be heard by an advisory panel. Prior to the fire, Rabbi Mendel Greenbaum had been in discussion with groups such as the Chinese-American Planning Council and the Gotham Organization about selling the building's air rights in connection with the potential development of a neighboring parcel, to help pay for the possible renovation and preservation of the synagogue. The LPC responded on July 11 with a permit for removal of unsafe parts of the building, but required that other parts be evaluated for possible preservation. The LPC's engineers would monitor the demolition. Parts of the damaged synagogue were being demolished by early 2018.

After the fire, the Chinese-American Planning Council and the Gotham Organization originally planned to incorporate the remnants of the synagogue building into their 30-story residential development. However, in June 2019, the LPC's engineers announced that the remnants of the south tower would have to be destroyed due to its structural instability. A worker died in October 2019 after part of the burned building collapsed. An investigation found that an engineer and a demolition firm, both hired by Beth Hamedrash Hagodol, had recommended the demolition of the whole building but that the DOB had refused to overrule the orders of LPC commissioners. A housing lottery for the residential development at 60 Norfolk Street, which replaced the synagogue building, was launched in 2022.

== See also ==
- National Register of Historic Places listings in Manhattan below 14th Street
- List of New York City Designated Landmarks in Manhattan below 14th Street
