= City Church =

City Church may refer to:

- City Church (Brazil), Brazil
- City Church of Bremgarten, Switzerland
- City Church, Oxford, England
- Christian City Church, Oxford Falls, Sydney, Australia
- Donau City Church, Vienna, Austria
- Lutheran City Church, Vienna, Austria
- City Church, affiliated with Abundant Life Christian School in Madison, Wisconsin

== See also ==
- New York City Church Extension and Missionary Society, USA
