= Hester Street =

Hester Street may refer to:

- Hester Street (Manhattan), a street on the Lower East Side of the New York City Borough of Manhattan
- Hester Street (film), a 1975 film based on Abraham Cahan's 1896 novella Yekl: A Tale of the New York Ghetto
