= Jacob Joseph =

American rabbi (1840–1902)

Rabbi Jacob Joseph
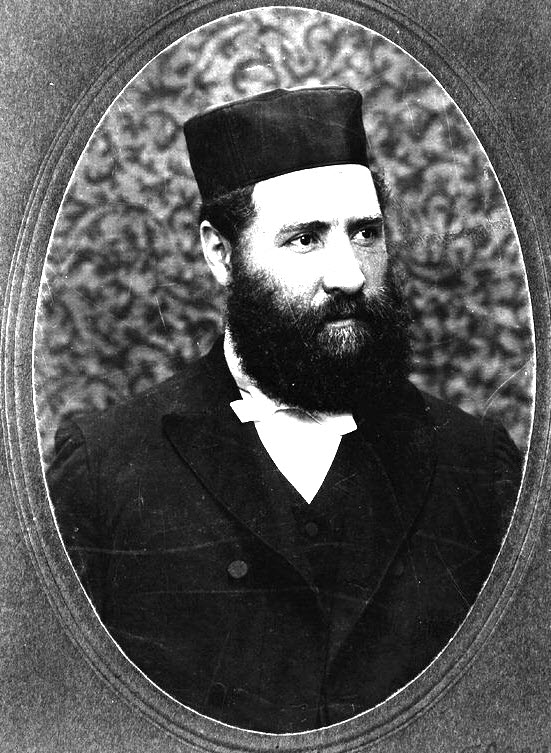
- Rabbi Jacob Joseph
- Title: Chief Rabbi

Personal life
- Born: 1840 Krozhe, Kovno, Russian Empire
- Died: July 28, 1902 (aged 61–62) New York City, United States
- Notable work: Le'Beis Yaakov
- Education: Volozhin yeshiva
- Known for: Chief Rabbi of New York City's Association of American Orthodox Hebrew Congregations
- Occupation: Rabbi

Religious life
- Religion: Judaism

Jewish leader
- Post: Rabbi of Vilon (1868); Rabbi of Yurburg (1870); Rabbi of Zhagory; Chief Rabbi of Vilna (1883); Chief Rabbi of New York City (1888–1902)

Jacob Joseph (Hebrew: יעקב יוסף; 1840 – July 28, 1902) served as chief rabbi of New York City's Association of American Orthodox Hebrew Congregations, a federation of Eastern European Jewish synagogues, from 1888 until his death in 1902. Born in Krozhe, a province of Kovno, he studied in the Nevyozer Kloiz under Rabbi Yisrael Salanter and in the Volozhin yeshiva under the Netziv. In Volozhin, he was known as "Rav Yaakov Charif" (Rabbi Jacob Sharp) because of his sharp mind.

He became successively rabbi of Vilon in 1868, Yurburg in 1870, and later in Zhagory. His fame as a preacher spread, so that in 1883 the community of Vilna selected him as its maggid.

The Rabbi Jacob Joseph School, also known as RJJ, is named after him and a playground is named after and honors the memory of a great-grandson of Rabbi Jacob Joseph who carried his name.

== Chief rabbi ==
Some in the Jewish community of New York wanted to be united under a common religious authority, and although the Reform and liberal factions ridiculed the idea, the mainly Russian Orthodox Ashkenazi community sent a circular offering the post throughout Eastern Europe.

Rabbi Jacob Joseph was among those offered the prestigious position. He hesitated in coming to America, aware that there were fewer religious Jews. Nevertheless, in 1888 he accepted the challenge in order to support his family, and also because he faced severe debt in Russia. The Association of American Orthodox Hebrew Congregations—comprising 18 congregations and headed by Beth Hamedrash Hagadol—was pleased when he accepted the position.

They attempted to create one central rabbinic authority in America to maintain order in the field of Kashrus and expand Jewish education programs. Their idea ultimately failed. Although Joseph certainly possessed the credentials needed, he was confronted with many problems and his tenure was marked by the divisiveness of New York Jewry. His right to exercise authority over New York's Jewish communities was questioned because, in addition to his Orthodox supporters of Eastern European heritage, the community also included Ashkenazi Orthodox Jews from other areas of Europe, Orthodox Jews who had been in America for generations and did not welcome him as a source of authority, Ashkenazi Jews of the Reform denomination, Sephardic Jews, Mizrahi Jews, anti-religious Jews, and Jewish Communists.

Most of the disputation arose in regard to the kosher slaughterhouses of the city. To support the rabbi, a small charge was made for his certification of kosher meat, which was paid by the customer. Some customers felt that the imposition of this fee for kosher certification was similar to the taxes that antisemitic governments had imposed on kosher meat in Europe and Russia. Some felt that it drove the price of meat higher for no good reason. Others wanted a return to the days when they could simply trust their own kosher butchers, without the approval of a foreign rabbi, who did not even speak English. These disputes became personal when culturally Jewish but anti-religious Yiddish newspapers opposed to the concept of a centralized Orthodox rabbinical authority printed unflattering rumours about the chief rabbi's personal life. Eventually, after six years, the Association stopped paying the rabbi's salary. The butchers then paid him until 1895. This did not stop the conflict, however, for when the butchers paid his fees, charges were made that the rabbi might certify non-kosher meat simply for the money.

=== Successes ===
Although Joseph fought a losing battle in the kosher meat and poultry industry, he managed to achieve some notable accomplishments, including the hiring of qualified shochtim, introducing irremovable seals ("plumba") to identify kosher birds, and setting up Mashgichim to oversee slaughter houses. He also took an active role in establishing the Etz Chaim Yeshiva—the first yeshiva on the Lower East Side, which was founded in 1886. (It was the forerunner of the Rabbi Isaac Elchanan Theological Seminary.)

== Works ==
Joseph published:

- Le'Beis Yaakov (Vilna, 1888), a collection of homilies and novellæ.

== Death ==
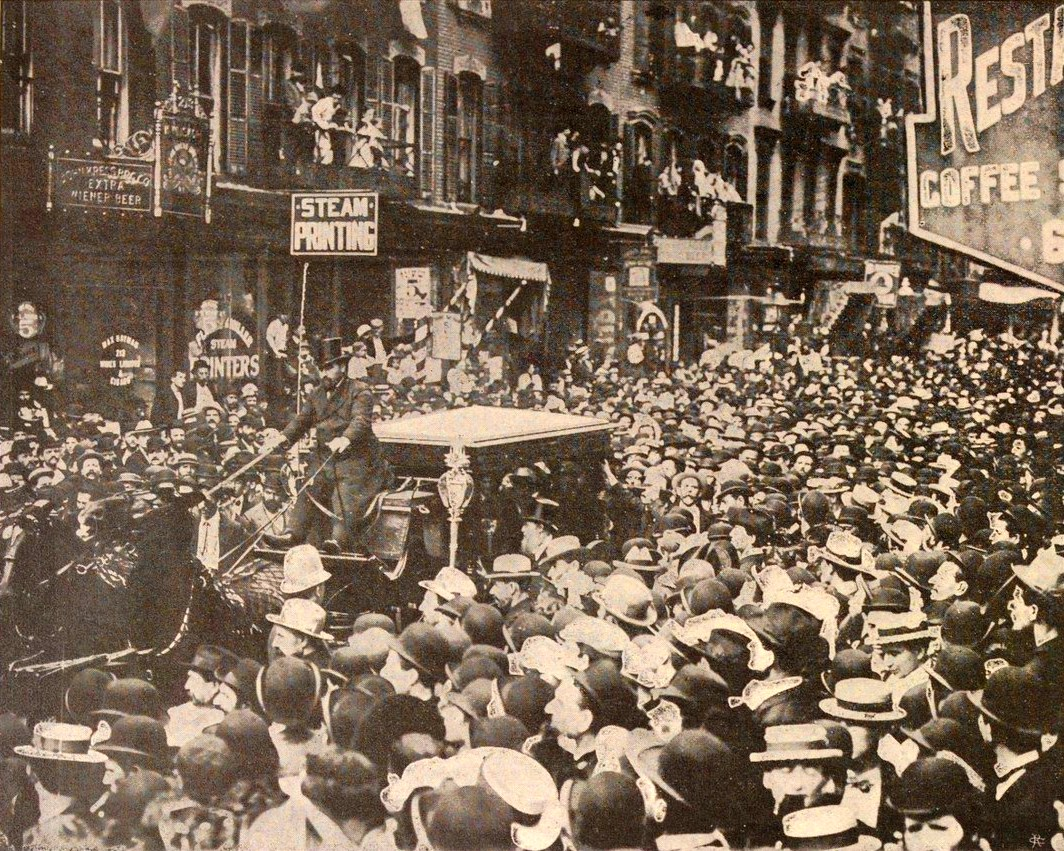
Rabbi Joseph Funeral Riot (Le Monde illustré, August 23, 1902).

In 1897, Joseph suffered a stroke, which incapacitated him, although he was still Chief Rabbi when New York saw the outbreak of the 1902 kosher meat boycott, which began on May 11. At that time, 400 kosher butchers on the East Side organized a boycott of the meat trusts, pressuring them to lower a sudden rise in the cost of meat. The trusts prevailed and the kosher butchers ended their boycott, but at that point the women of the Lower East Side Jewish community, led by Fanny Levy and Sarah Edelson, held a massive protest. On May 15, 20,000 protesters, mostly women, took to the streets to attack the butcher shops. They smashed shop windows, poured gasoline on the meat, lit it on fire, and threw pieces of meat at police officers. As the boycott continued, almost all purchases of kosher meats ceased. By May 22, the kosher Retail Butchers Association realigned itself with the women's boycott campaign and ceased selling kosher meat. By May 27, major Orthodox religious leaders had publicly affirmed support for the boycott, and by June 9 the price of meat dropped almost to pre-boycott levels.

Throughout this upheaval in the kosher meat business, which Joseph nominally oversaw for the entire city, the Chief Rabbi himself was sidelined by the stroke he had suffered five years earlier. He died on July 28, 1902, at the age of 62. His funeral was one of the largest in New York, attended by more than 50,000 Jews. It was disrupted by a public disturbance in which a number of people were injured. Employees of R. Hoe & Company, manufacturer of printing presses, threw water, paper, wood, and iron on the mourners from the upper floors of the factory at 504 Grand Street. Two hundred policemen responded to the call, hitting and pushing the mourners. Some of Hoe's employees, who had been harassing local Jews for some time, joined the police in the riot and beat mourners. Jewish oral tradition blamed the antisemitism of both the Irish factory workers and the police. Recent historical research suggests that the factory workers were mostly Germans, not Irish, and that the police were following standard practice in quelling a riot. On the whole, the police kept a tight lid on inter-group violence.

After Joseph's death many congregations began to give him the honor which they had withheld during his life. Aside from the tens of thousands who came to see him lying on his death bed, forty rabbis gathered in the cemetery for his funeral. The congregations also competed with each other, each one desiring to bury him in its own cemetery. Congregation Adath Israel on Elridge Street promised to give his widow $1,000 right away and $10 a week all the rest of her life. Congregation Beis HaMidrash HaGadol was permitted to bury him in their plot at the Union Field Cemetery in Ridgewood, Queens. The plots near the grave of the chief rabbi became extremely valuable. Congregation Adath Israel sent his widow the amount promised for several years, and then stopped.

With Joseph's death, a succession dispute arose which diluted the office of Chief Rabbi, and the title was rendered effectively worthless.

== Descendants ==
His grandson, Lazarus Joseph (1891–1966), was a NY State Senator and New York City Comptroller.

A playground on Manhattan's Lower East Side, bounded by Henry and Rutgers Streets, is named in memory of Captain Jacob Joseph (1920–1942), great-grandson of Rabbi Jacob Joseph and son of Lazarus Joseph, who was a member of the U.S. Marine Corps during World War II.

Born and raised in New York, Joseph left Columbia University as a junior in 1938 to enlist in the Marines. He died in action at Guadalcanal on October 22, 1942. Joseph was at the time the youngest captain in the USMC. Five years later, a local law named this playground in his honor. The dedication ceremony was attended by Mayor William O'Dwyer, Parks Commissioner Robert Moses, Councilman Stanley Isaacs, and Captain Joseph's father Lazarus Joseph – a Democratic Party leader who was a six time State Senator and New York City's Comptroller at the time.

The New York City Department of Parks and Recreation also unveiled a bronze commemorative plaque on the flagstaff. This playground was built in part to meet the needs of the Rabbi Jacob Joseph School, located at the time on Henry Street. The playground also serves as a memorial to other notable members of the Joseph family..

There is a Captain Jacob Joseph Memorial Chapel at Camp Keowa, which is part of the Ten Mile River Boy Scout Camp in Sullivan County. The chapel was restored by a group of veterans led by Scoutmaster Tom Maher. Each August a memorial service is held for Captain Joseph at the camp. The memorial includes an interfaith service during which a Kaddish is said for Captain Joseph, who is believed to have no descendants.
