= Avraham Duber Kahana Shapiro =

Lithuanian rabbi (1870–1943)

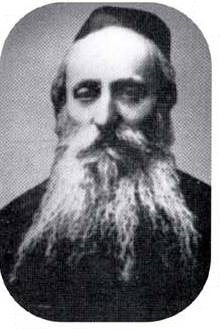

Avraham Dov-Ber Kahana Shapiro (1870 – February 27, 1943) was the last Chief Rabbi of Kovno (Kaunas, Lithuania) and the author of Devar Avraham, a three-volume collection of responsa (answers to questions of religious practice).

== Biography ==
He was born in 1870 to Rabbi Shlomo Zalman Sender, a Kohen (hereditary Jewish priest) and author of Sefer Chidushei HaGarzas on Kodshim, on October 5 on the night immediately following Yom Kippur, in the city of Kobryn. He was a descendant of Rabbi Chaim Volozhin.

He studied in the Volozhin Yeshiva. The first volume of his magnum opus, the Devar Avraham, was published in 1906 when he was thirty-five years old.

== Army service ==
At 18 years old he was drafted into the Russian army and sent to Minsk, where he used his limited spare time to "clandestinely enter the local Beis Midrash (study house)... The Rav [rabbi] of Minsk, R[abbi] Yerucham Yitzchak Perlman" worked to obtain his release, and subsequently "took him as a son-in-law."

== Rabbi ==
In 1896 he received his first rabbinical position at the age of 25, upon the passing of his father-in-law, and was named Chief Rabbi of the city of Kovno in 1923. His students included Ephraim Oshry, author of Sheilos U'Teshuvos M'Mamakim.

He was the last Chief Rabbi of Lithuania.

== Death ==
Shapiro was in Switzerland for health reasons before the war broke out. His son, who was living in the United States, sent him a telegram to join him in the U.S. until the war was over His father, upon receiving the telegram, showed it to one of his close friends, saying, "The captain is the last to abandon his sinking ship, not the first. At this time of danger, my place is with the people of my city. I am going to Kovno." He died of an illness in the Kovno Ghetto on February 27, 1943. He is buried in the same cemetery as Yitzchak Elchanan Spektor.
