= Ephraim Oshry =

Rabbi Ephraim Oshry

Personal life
- Born: 1908 Kupiškis
- Died: September 28, 2003 (aged 94–95) New York City
- Buried: Jerusalem
- Spouse: Freida Greensweig
- Children: 6 sons, 3 daughters
- Education: Slabodka Yeshiva

Religious life
- Religion: Judaism
- Denomination: Orthodox Judaism

Jewish leader
- Successor: Rabbi Mendel Greenbaum
- Position: Rabbi
- Synagogue: Beth Hamedrash Hagadol
- Yahrtzeit: 2nd Day Rosh Hashana

Ephraim Oshry (1908–September 28, 2003), was an Orthodox rabbi, posek, and author of The Annihilation of Lithuanian Jewry. He was one of the few European rabbis to survive the Holocaust.

== Early life ==
Oshry was born in Kupiškis, Lithuania. He studied alongside some of the most prominent and revered Jewish leaders and rabbis of his time, including the Alter of Slabodka, Moshe Mordechai Epstein, Isaac Sher and Avraham Duber Kahana Shapiro (author of Devar Avraham). He quickly rose to prominence among the students at Slabodka Yeshiva.

== World War II ==
When the Nazis invaded Kaunas in 1941 during World War II, Oshry's community was forced into the Kaunas Ghetto and concentration camp, where his first wife and children were murdered.

In his book, The Annihilation of Lithuanian Jewry, Oshry tells his story of living through the Holocaust. He related in horrific detail how the Nazis and their Lithuanian collaborators viciously murdered Jews, but he also focused on the spiritual life of the Jews living in the Kovno Ghetto and concentration camp. Despite being starved and beaten, the Jews continued to study Torah in secret, and risked their lives in order to fulfill the mitzvot (God's commandments).

=== Responsa ===
While in the Kaunas Ghetto and concentration camp, Oshry began writing his responsa regarding the Holocaust, answering difficult questions in such subjects as human nature, God, and Jewish ethics. Before the final battle between the Nazis and the Soviets, Oshry buried his responsa in the ground. After the war, he retrieved them, and in 1959, he published some of the Hebrew responsa under the title She'eilos Uteshuvos Mima'amakim (Questions and Responses from the Depths). This volume was later followed by four additional volumes, the final one being published in 1979. An English volume of the original work (adbridged, with much of the halakhic argumentation removed), was published, titled Responsa from the Holocaust.

== Post-war activities ==
After Kaunas was liberated in August 1944, Oshry and his wife Frieda Greenzwieg, a survivor of Auschwitz, went to Rome. There Oshry started a yeshiva for orphaned refugee children.

In 1950, Oshry moved to Montreal, Quebec, Canada, with his family and yeshiva students.

In 1952, Oshry moved to New York City, where he became the rabbi of Beth Hamedrash Hagodol on the Lower East Side of Manhattan. Oshry opened a yeshiva for boys and a yeshiva for girls named Yeshivah Torah V'Emunah in the East Bronx.

== Family ==
In 1949, Oshry became engaged to his second wife, Frieda Greensweig, a daughter of Sigeter Hasidim, at the suggestion of her uncle Moshe Friserman, the Tomashover Rebbe. Together they had 6 sons, all of whom became rabbis, and 3 daughters. Frieda died in 2018.

== Death ==
Oshry died on September 28, 2003, at Mount Sinai Hospital in New York City. Nearly 1,000 mourners attended his funeral. He is buried in Jerusalem.

== Legacy ==
Yeshiva Shaar Ephraim in Monsey, New York is named after him. It is headed by his son-in-law.

== Works ==
- Oshry, Ephraim. Annihilation of Lithuanian Jewry, Judaica Press, 1995 ISBN 978-1-880582-18-3
- Oshry, Ephraim. Responsa from the Holocaust, B. Goldman and Y. Leiman Eds., Judaica Press, 2001 ISBN 978-1-880582-71-8

== See also ==
- Yisroel Spira
