= Abraham Joseph Ash =

Rabbi (c. 1813–1888)

Abraham Joseph Ash (c. 1813–1888) was an Orthodox rabbi and Talmudist.

== Life ==
Ash was born in Siemiatycze about 1813. Coming to the United States in 1852, he helped to organize, in New York City, the first Russian-American congregation, Beth Hamedrash Hagodol, and eight years later he was elected its rabbi. In this capacity, he served till his death, with the exception of brief intervals in which he made futile attempts to engage in business, seeking to free himself from dependence on the rabbinate for a livelihood. He strenuously opposed the endeavour by some of the Reform rabbis in 1886 to deliver lectures in Orthodox congregations, and he wrote an open protest headed with the Talmudic legal phrase מה לשור המזיק ברשות הניזק ("What right has the ox of the damager in the premises of the one damaged!").

Ash died in New York City on May 6, 1888.
