= Forsyth Street =

Street in Manhattan, New York

Coordinates: 40°43′8.26″N 73°59′33.23″W

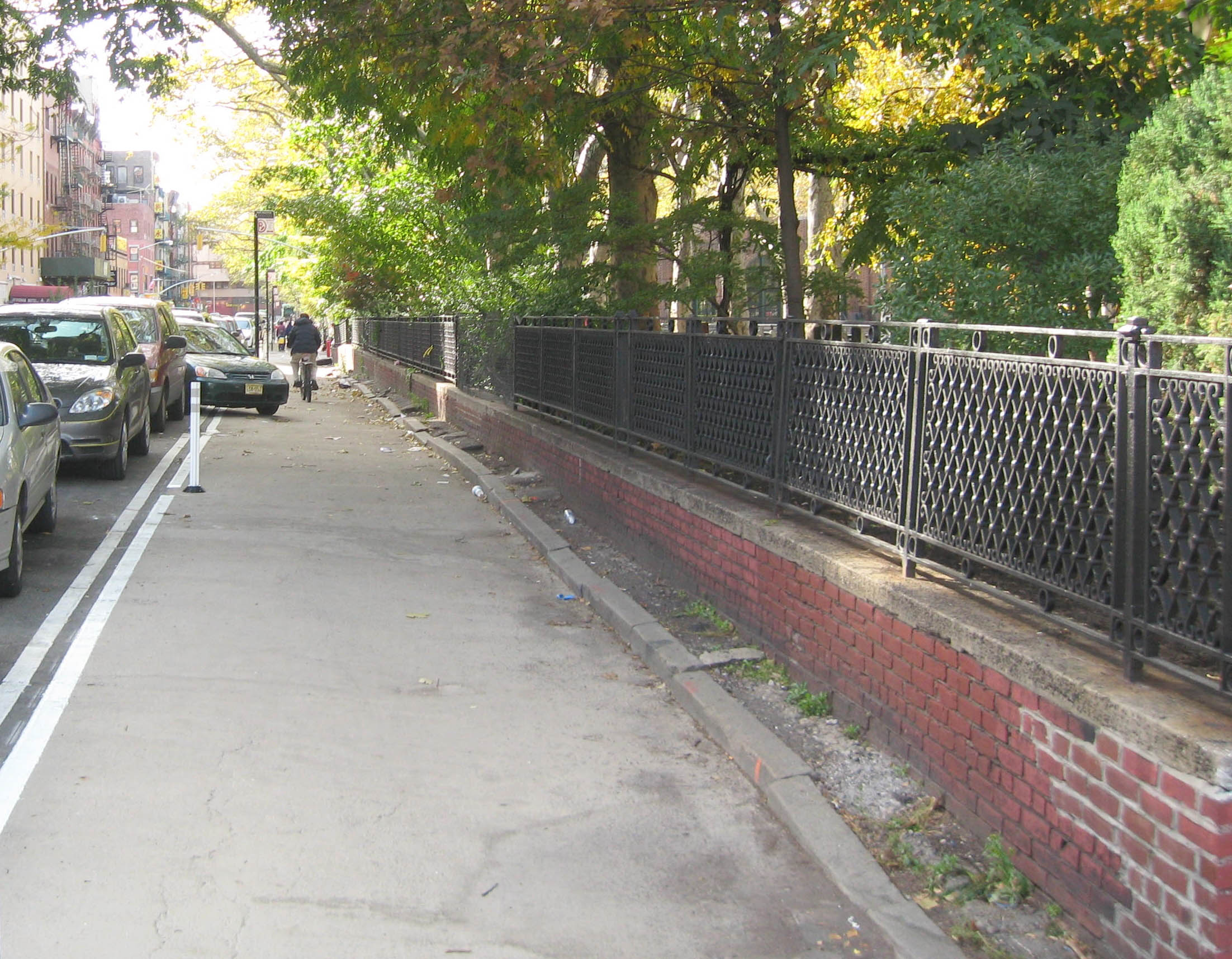
Forsyth Street in 2018

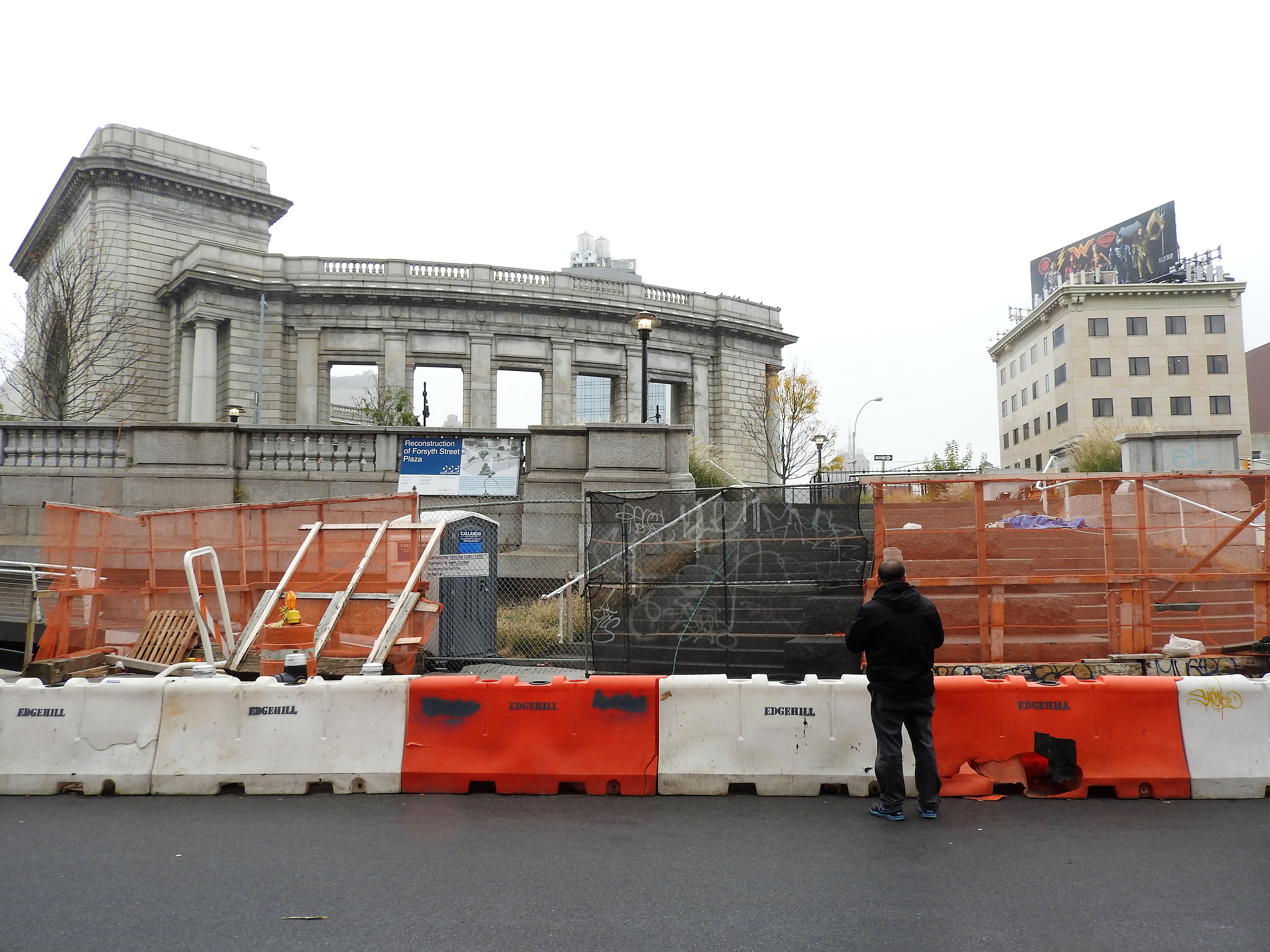
Forsyth Street in 2017, under construction

Forsyth Street runs from Houston Street south to Henry Street in the New York City borough of Manhattan. The street was named in 1817 for Lt. Colonel Benjamin Forsyth.

Forsyth Street's southernmost portion, south of Canal Street, runs parallel to the Manhattan Bridge in Chinatown. On the west side of this block, a greenmarket operates in the shadow of the bridge.

Forsyth Street is interrupted north of Canal Street for one block due to a 20th-century schoolhouse, now housing Pace University High School and I.S. 131, built on the former route. There is a dead-end section of Forsyth Street just north of Canal Street, which is used as a parking area and open street. North of there it runs parallel to Chrystie Street that lies to its west, with Sara D. Roosevelt Park separating the two. Since October 2008 the parallel parking lane on the west side of the street is separated from the curb by a bicycle lane carrying traffic north from the Manhattan Bridge. The street traverses the Lower East Side neighborhood of Manhattan.

From south to north, Forsyth Street starts at Henry Street, intersects East Broadway, Division Street, and Canal Street, becomes a pedestrian street for one block, then continues from Hester Street, intersects Grand Street, Broome Street, Delancey Street, Rivington Street and Stanton Street, and ends at Houston Street.

In the 2010s, Forsyth Street Plaza underwent construction, fully reopening on Jay 25, 2018.
