= Lower East Side Conservancy =

American educational and advocacy group

The Lower East Side Conservancy, also known as The Lower East Side Jewish Conservancy (LESJC), is an educational and advocacy organization, created in 1998 by Holly Kaye to preserve the synagogues and cultural heritage of the Lower East Side. Through the organization's efforts, many have been designated as historic landmarks, and have been listed on New York State and National Registers. In 2000, the Conservancy assisted in designating a 32 – block area as a historic district.

Their mission is accomplished through quality touring programs, both private, public, and educational, which showcase the Lower East Side's landmarks, history and people. A portion of the proceeds of each tour are returned to the sites visited, contributing to their restoration and conservation. They are the only touring organization with access to the 'Bialystoker Synagogue, a former Methodist Church, believed to be a site on the Underground Railroad, and an active shteibl (a traditional one room house of prayer) on historic East Broadway.

In addition to the Lower East Side, the LESJC provides tours of other New York neighborhoods of Jewish importance, such as Jewish Harlem, the Upper West Side, and Williamsburg, Brooklyn.

The conservancy aimed to transform the old Beth Hamedrash Hagadol into a visitors center for the Lower East Side with educational programs and gallery space, but the building was destroyed in 2017 with a fire, and was torn down in 2019.
