= Sara D. Roosevelt Park =

Public park in Manhattan, New York

Sara Delano Roosevelt Park
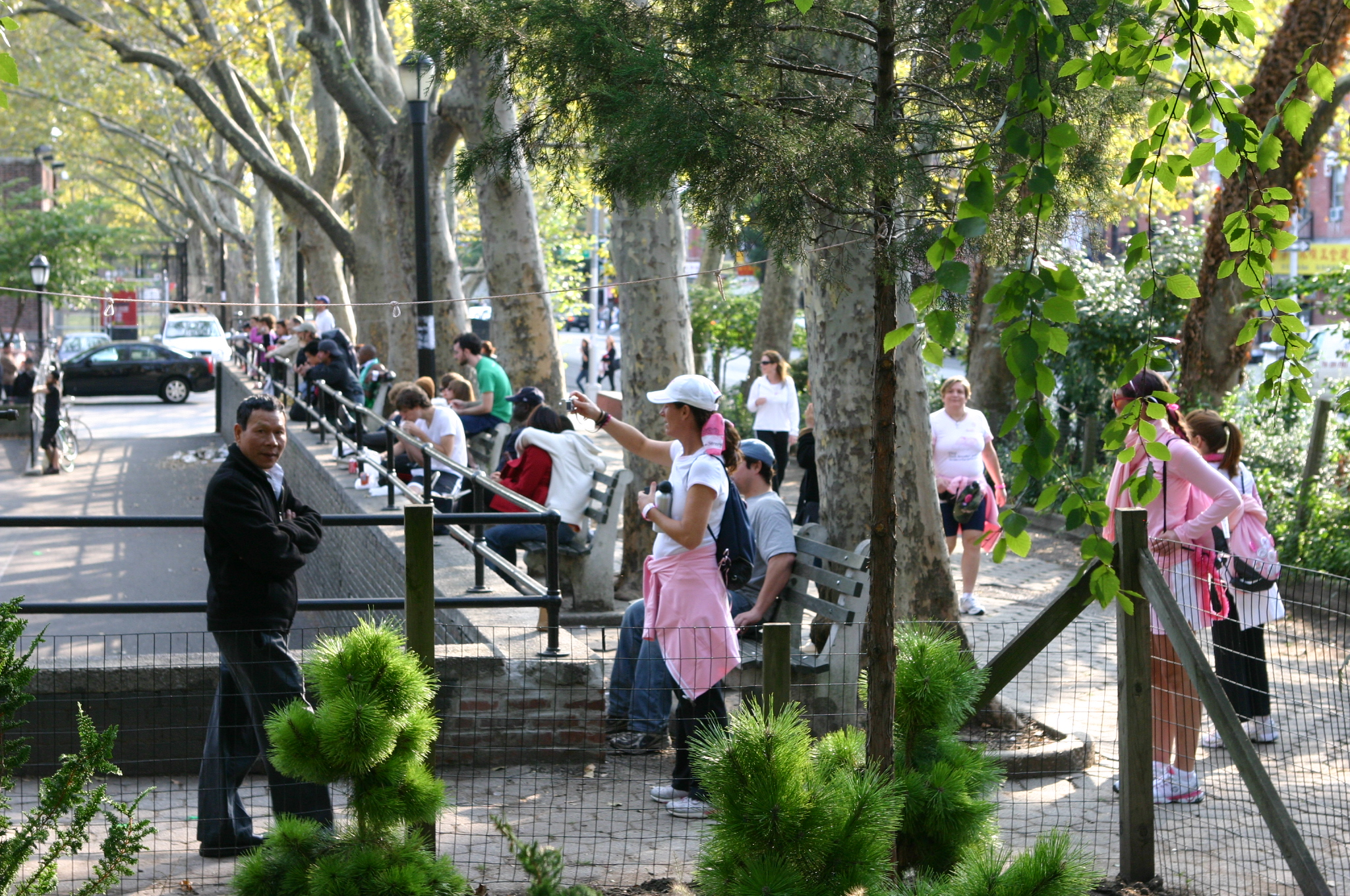
- Western side of the park
- Interactive map of Sara Delano Roosevelt Park
- Type: public
- Location: Lower East Side, Manhattan, New York City
- Coordinates: 40.7193°N 73.9928°W
- Area: 7.85 acres (3.18 ha)
- Created: 1934
- Operator: New York City Department of Parks and Recreation
- Website: www.nycgovparks.org/parks/sara-d-roosevelt-park/

Sara Delano Roosevelt Park is a 7.8-acre (3.2 ha) park on the Lower East Side of the New York City borough of Manhattan. The park, named after Sara Roosevelt (1854–1941), the mother of President Franklin Delano Roosevelt, stretches north–south along seven blocks between East Houston Street on the Lower East Side and Canal Street in Chinatown, bordered by Chrystie Street on the west and Forsyth Street on the east. The park is operated and maintained by the New York City Department of Parks and Recreation.

The park cuts off Stanton, Rivington, Broome and Hester Streets between Chrystie and Forsyth Streets, and is crossed by Delancey and Grand Streets.

== History ==
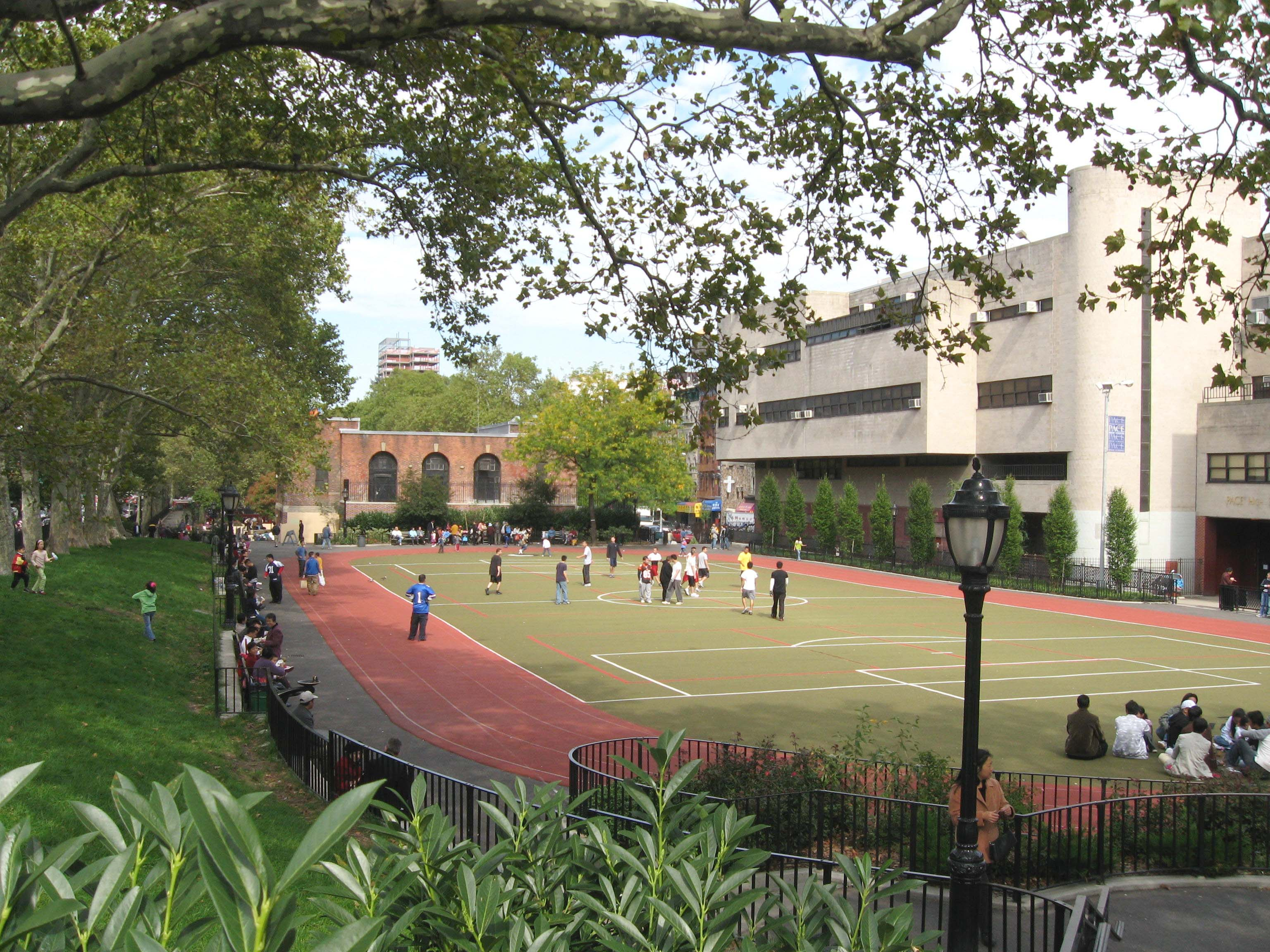
South end soccer field

The site was previously occupied by walk-up apartments and before that, an African-American burial ground. Part of it was once the Dutch Reformed Church Cemetery.

The land was originally acquired by the city of New York in 1929 for the purpose of widening Chrystie and Forsyth Streets and building low-cost housing, but was instead used for parkland. The park was named for Sara Roosevelt, the mother of Franklin D. Roosevelt, in March 1934, despite her written objection. The park was completed in September 1934. It was designed under the leadership of newly installed Parks Commissioner Robert Moses, landscape architect Gilmore D. Clarke, and architect Aymar Embury II. The original design placed an emphasis on athletic fields and "active recreation" spaces for children, such as wading pools, with separate areas for boys and girls.

In later decades, community groups adapted the park to various uses. In the 1980s, the park suffered from crime and drug problems, until a community effort revitalized it. The Sara D. Roosevelt Park Coalition, formed in 1982, established the M'finda Kalunga community garden in 1983, and has initiated several other initiatives. Another group, the Forsyth Garden Conservancy, has built several smaller gardens inside the park since the mid-1990s, including the Hua Mei Bird Garden, where songbird owners congregate. Between 2005 and 2022 the park received $11.4 million of improvements from the parks department. In 2022, The New York Times reported that the park had become "a catch basin for the city's crime and drug problems and homeless crisis".

== Amenities ==
The park offers playing surfaces for several sports, including a basketball court, roller skating rink and a soccer field. There are two full-court basketball courts between Houston and Stanton streets, followed by a children's playground, and then another two full-court basketball courts between Stanton and Rivington streets. The latter two courts are painted colorfully, following a collaboration between Nike, the New York Parks & Recreation Department, and New Jersey street artist KAWS. The park is also the home of the New York City Bike Polo Club.

The park had a service facility which included a public restroom until 1994, when it was closed.

== Memorials ==
In the park, just south of Stanton Street, the M’Finda Kalunga Garden honors the memory of an African-American burial ground that was located on nearby Chrystie Street between Rivington and Stanton Streets. A commemorative plaque was installed in 1983.

Across Forsyth Street from the park, between Stanton and Rivington Streets, was the "Garden of Eden", a community garden during 1975–1985 created by local activist and environmentalist Adam Purple.
