= Chrystie Street =

Street in Manhattan, New York

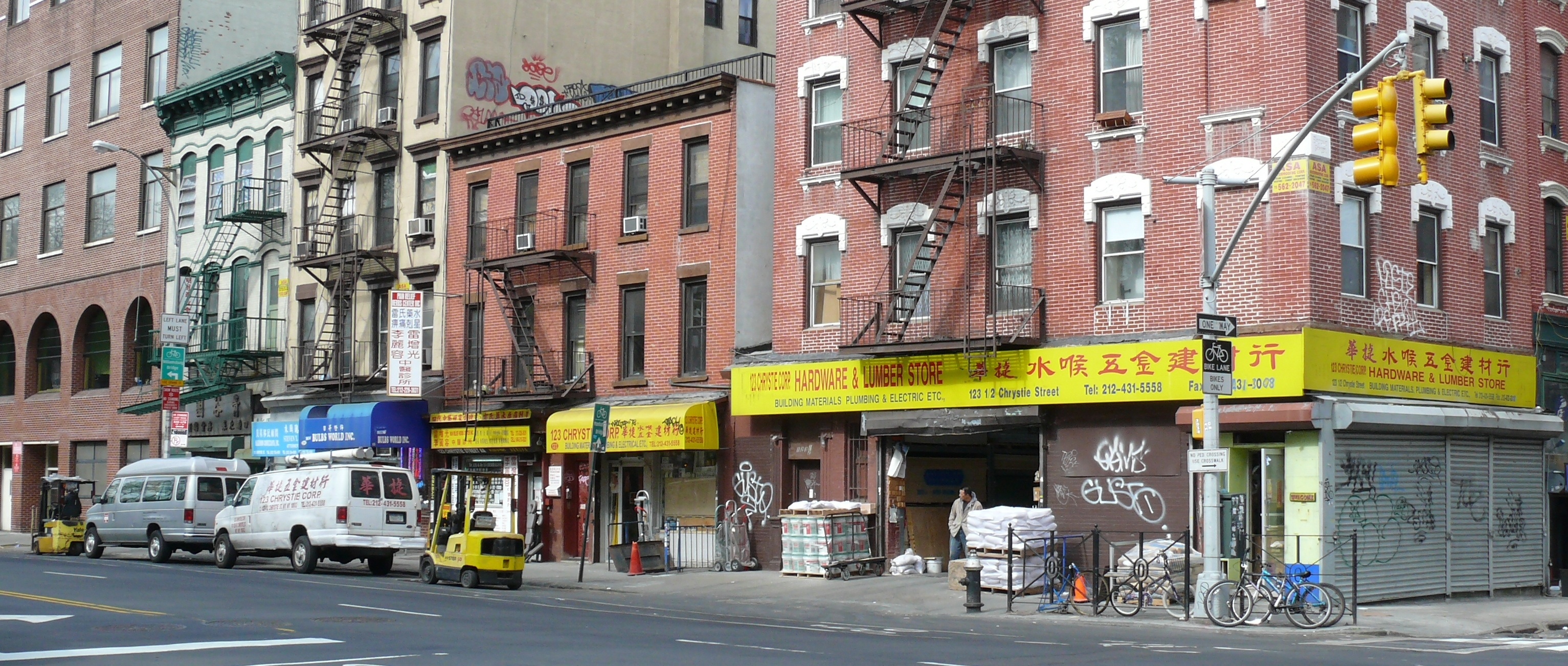
Part of Chrystie Street in Chinatown

Chrystie Street is a street on Manhattan's Lower East Side and Chinatown, running as a continuation of Second Avenue from Houston Street, for seven blocks south to Canal Street. It is bounded on the east for its entirety by Sara D. Roosevelt Park, for the creation of which the formerly built-up east side of Chrystie Street (the even numbers) was razed, eliminating among other structures three small synagogues. Originally called First Street, it was renamed for Col. John Chrystie, a veteran of the War of 1812 and a member of the Philolexian Society of Columbia University, and a new First Street was laid out above Houston Street.

== Transportation ==
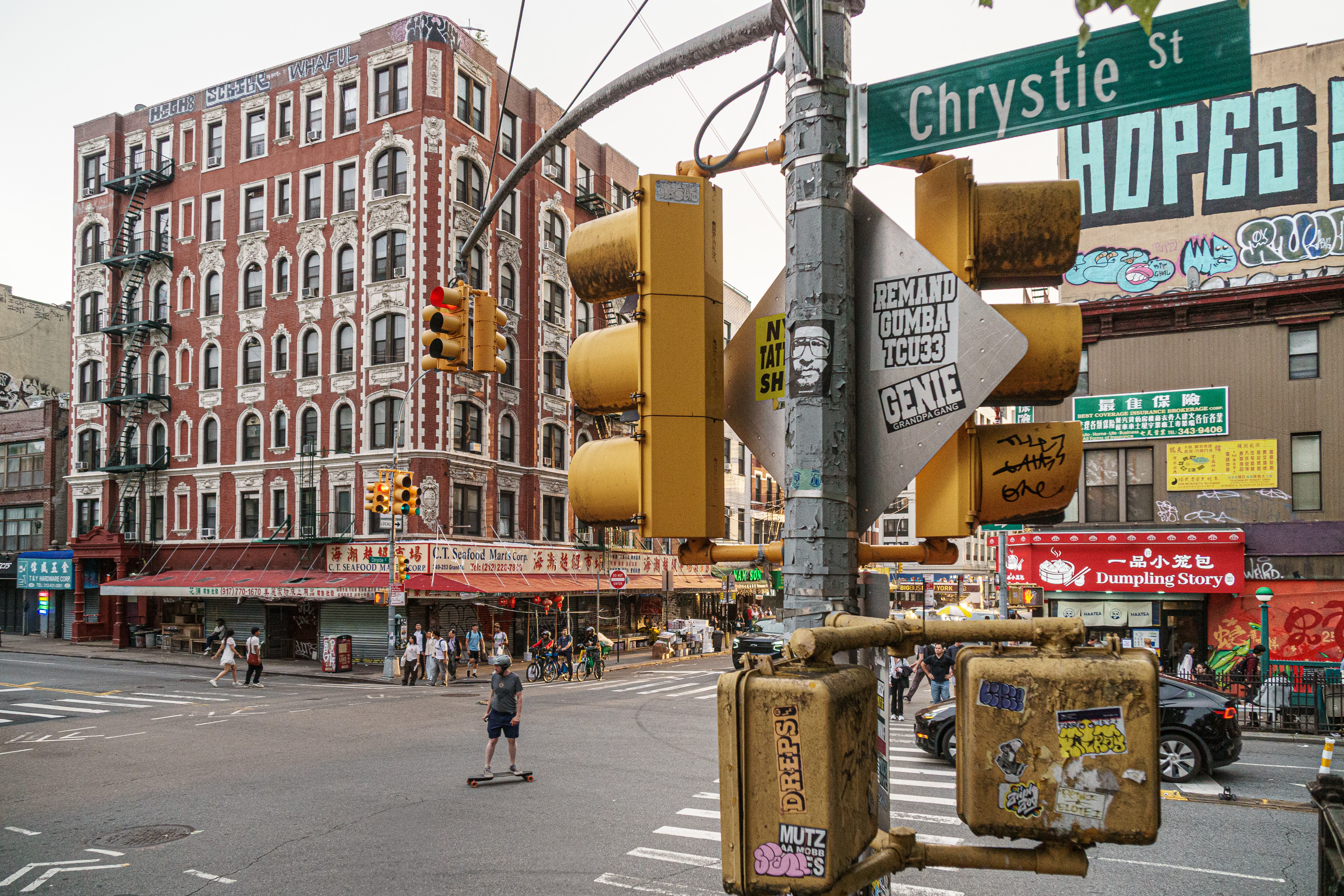
Chrystie and Grand Street

In 1967, the Chrystie Street Connection—a major connecting line of the New York City Subway—opened; it is one of the few connections between lines of the (former) BMT and IND divisions. The B and D trains of the New York City Subway can be reached at the Grand Street station.

A protected two-way bike lane along Chrystie Street was built in 2016, replacing two older bike lanes that wove between the parking and travel lanes in each direction. It also directly connected the bike lanes between Second Avenue and the Manhattan Bridge.

== Notable locations ==
The second African Burying Ground was located on the west side of First (Chrystie) Street, between Stanton and Rivington Streets, extending to the Bowery, after the African Burial Ground near Collect Pond was declared closed in 1794. In the 1820s St Philip's assumed ownership from the City Council, and when the cemetery was closed in 1853, remains were disinterred and removed to Cypress Hills Cemetery.

On June 28, 1776, on the corner of Chrystie and Grand Streets, Thomas Hickey was hung in front of over 20,000 spectators for having participated in a plot to kill George Washington.

From 1847 through 1854, New York's Temple Emanu-El was located at 56 Chrystie Street, the site now part of the Park.

The settlement movement maintained a Settlement House there, where Lee Strasberg first became involved in the theater. Dorothy Day's Catholic Worker Movement continued this concept with one of their hospitality houses there. Michael Harrington frequented it in 1951/52 shortly after he moved to New York.

Dixon Place, a theater that previously occupied several sites in Lower Manhattan since their foundation in 1986, opened on Chrystie Street in 2009.

The cabaret nightclub The Box Manhattan, sister club to The Box Soho in London, is located in Chrystie Street.

== In popular culture ==
Chrystie Street appears in "59 Chrystie Street", the first section of the 15th track on the album Paul's Boutique by American hip hop group the Beastie Boys, released on July 25, 1989. The address in the title refers to an early residence of Beastie Boys group members.

In the mid seventies, an unrefurbished loft at 195 Chrystie Street became the shared home of Chris Frantz, Tina Weymouth and David Byrne. This was where they formed and rehearsed the rock group Talking Heads.

In the Spider-Man comic book series, Peter Parker's apartment was at 187 Chrystie Street.

In DC Comics' Doorway to Nightmare, Madame Xanadu (Nimue) lived on Chrystie Street, her doorway visible only to those in need of her services. It was sometimes misspelled "Christy", and was variously described as being in Greenwich Village or the East Village.
