= Hester Street (Manhattan) =

Street in Manhattan, New York

- Hester Street at Mott Street
- Interactive map of Hester Street
- Namesake: Hester Leisler Rynders (daughter of Jacob Leisler)
- Maintained by: NYCDOT
- Length: 0.6 mi (0.97 km)
- Location: Lower East Side; Chinatown; Little Italy, Manhattan, New York City
- Postal code: 10002, 10013
- Coordinates: 40.7171°N 73.9948°W
- West end: Centre Street (continues west as Howard Street)
- Major junctions: Baxter Street; Mulberry Street; Mott Street; Elizabeth Street; Bowery; Chrystie Street; Forsyth Street; Eldridge Street; Allen Street; Orchard Street; Ludlow Street
- East end: Essex Street at Seward Park

Hester Street is a street on the Lower East Side of the New York City borough of Manhattan. It stretches from Essex Street to Centre Street, with a discontinuity between Chrystie Street and Forsyth Street for Sara Delano Roosevelt Park. There is also a discontinuity at Allen Street, which was created in 2009 with the rebuilding of the Allen Street Mall. At Centre Street, Hester Street shifts about 100 feet (30 m) to the north and is called Howard Street to its far western terminus at Mercer Street.

Historically a center for Ashkenazi Jewish immigrant culture, more recently it has been absorbed by Chinatown, although some kosher and Jewish-owned stores remain.

== History ==
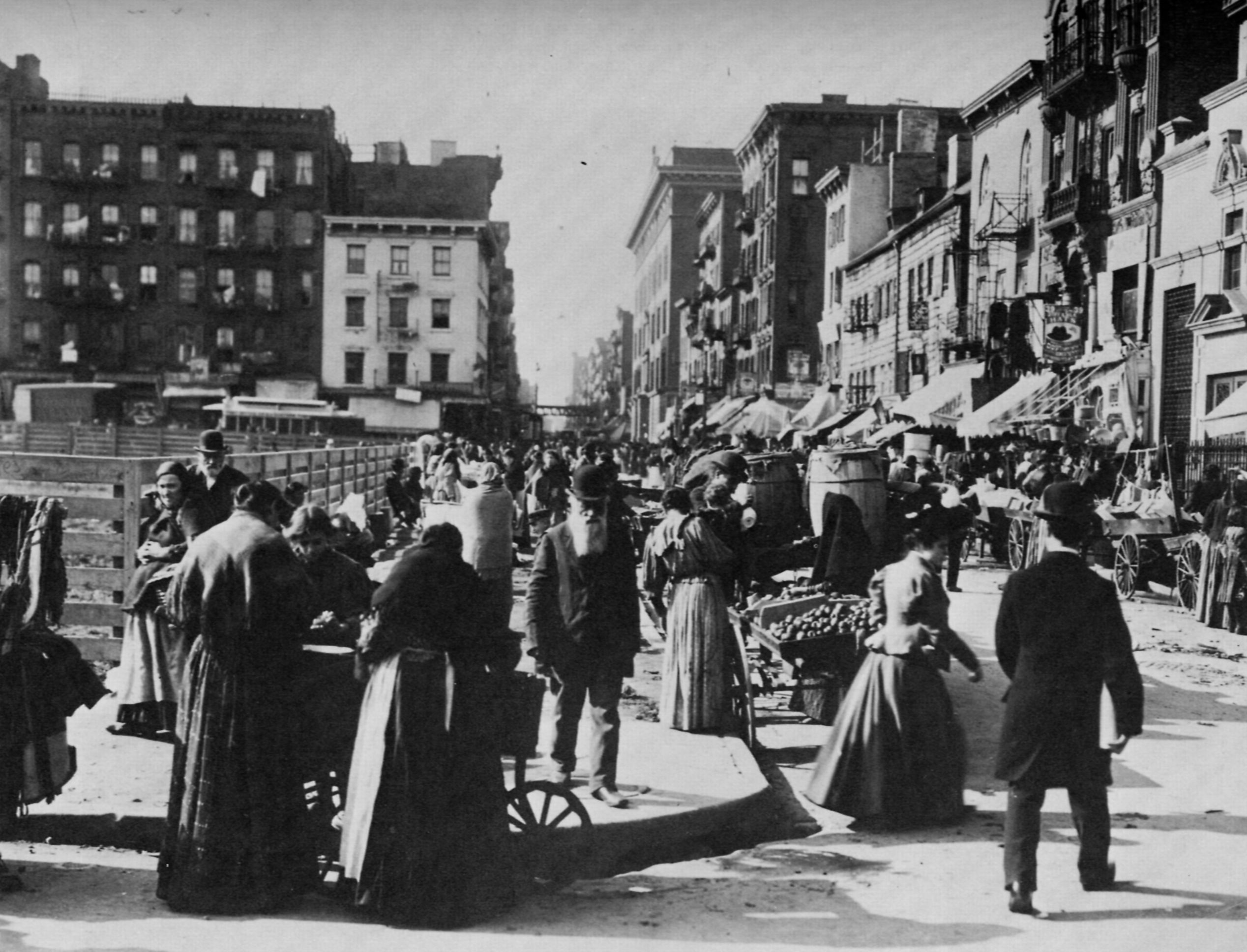
Looking west from Norfolk Street around 1898

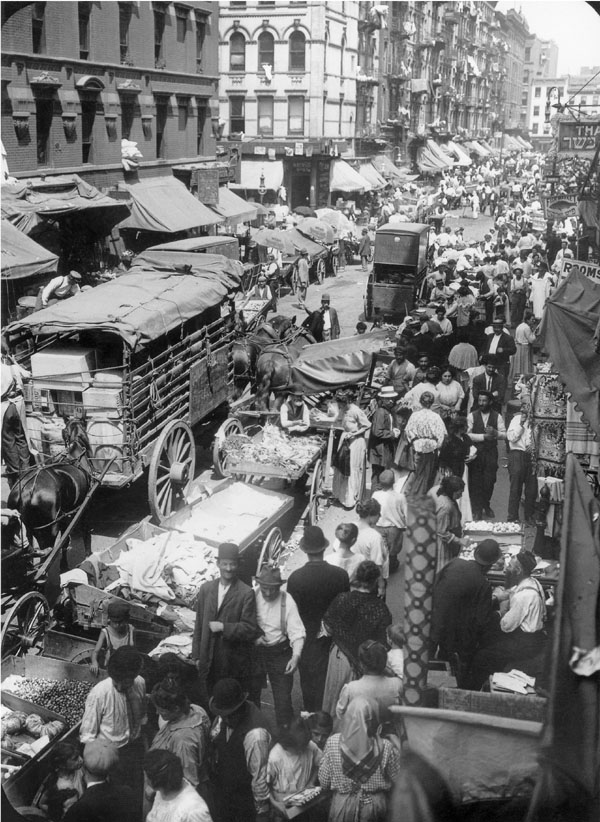
Hester Street around 1903

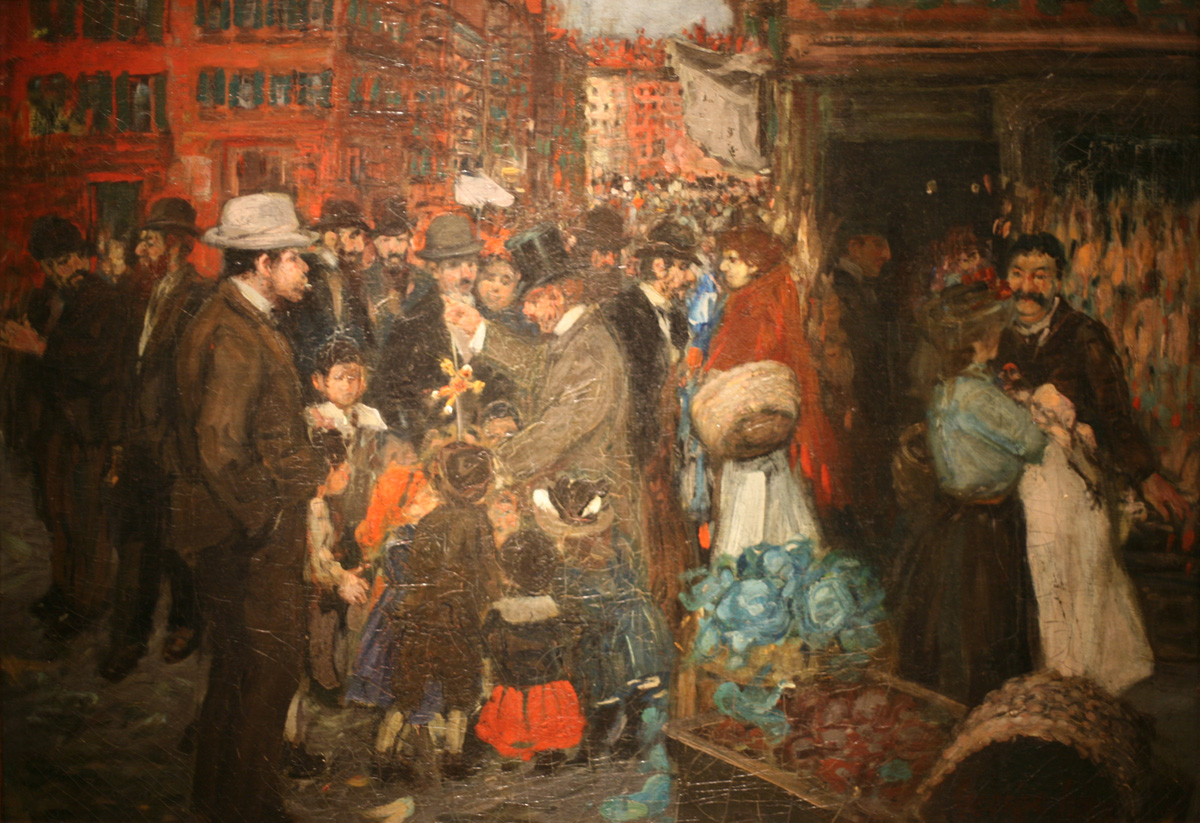
Street Scene by George Benjamin Luks, 1905 Brooklyn Museum

Hester Street was named after Hester Leisler, the daughter of Elsje Tymens and the insurrectionist Jacob Leisler, who was burned at the stake. Through her mother she was related to prominent Dutch families of the Hudson Valley, including the Bayards and the Van Cortlandts. She married Barent Rynders, Jr, a New York merchant, in 1696. She was the great-great-grandmother of Gouverneur Morris, a Founding Father of the United States.

In November 1851, the assistant board of aldermen of New York City voted in favor of removing a liberty pole at the junction of Hester Street and Division Street. The Franklin Building Association held its second regular monthly meeting at Washington Hall, on December 3, 1851. The building was located at the corner of Bowery. On April 15, 1912, an investigator reported that a parlor house on Hester Street had three inmates (prostitutes) who were waiting to entertain customers.

70 Hester Street was home to the First Roumanian-American Synagogue from 1881 to 1902, after which it moved a short distance to Rivington Street, where it remained until a 2006 fire.

As part of an experiment, in 1948, Hester Street was converted to a one-way eastbound street during the afternoon rush hour; it carried one-way westbound traffic at other times.

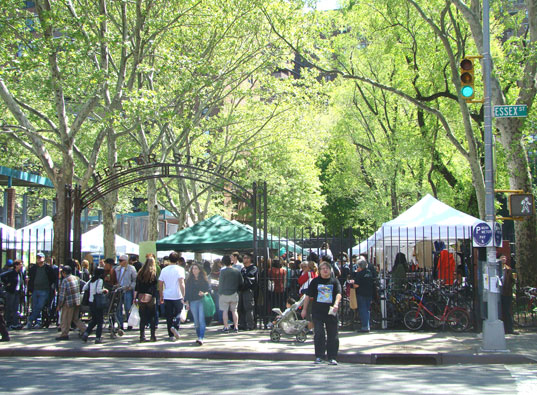
The Hester Street Fair on a typical weekend afternoon

At the east end of Hester Street, an open-air market called the Hester Street Fair currently runs on weekends from April through October. The market is on a parcel of land owned by Seward Park Co-op and is run by MTV News Correspondent SuChin Pak, her brother Suhyun Pak, Adam Zeller, and Ron Castellano.

== In popular culture ==
Hester Street is featured in Abraham Cahan's 1896 novel Yekl: A Tale of the New York Ghetto, and is the title of the 1974 period film Hester Street, adapted from Cahan's novel.

The street is mentioned in the first stanza of Lola Ridge's 1918 poem, "The Ghetto":

Cool, inaccessible air
Is floating in velvety blackness shot with steel-blue lights,
But no breath stirs the heat
Leaning its ponderous bulk upon the Ghetto
And most on Hester street...

The first chapter of the 1925 novel Bread Givers by Jewish-American author Anzia Yezierska is called "Hester Street". The novel tells the story of a young girl growing up in an immigrant Jewish household on the Lower East Side of New York City in the 1920s.

Al Stewart references Hester Street as part of the immigrant experience in his song "Murmansk Run/Ellis Island" on his 1980 album 24 Carrots, in part as follows:

Well you wake up in the morning on Hester Street and run to the factory, You can't afford to be late
Working every morning, every evening, every day for your money, Yet there's nothing to save

== Notable people ==
The sculptor Jacob Epstein was raised at 102 Hester Street.
