= New York City Church Extension and Missionary Society =

The New York City Church Extension and Missionary Society of the Methodist Episcopal Church was an organization whose mission was "... to promote Churches, Missions, and Sunday-schools in the City of New York." It built or purchased churches, missions, and Sunday schools, mostly in Manhattan and the Bronx, and primarily in poor areas, or areas that were being developed. Founded in 1866, it ran 24 congregations by 1895.

The Church Extension and Mission Society owned a number of landmark buildings in Manhattan that later became synagogues. These included, from 1878 to 1885, the building subsequently purchased by Beth Hamedrash Hagadol, and from 1889 to 1902, the building subsequently purchased by the First Roumanian-American congregation.
