= First Roumanian-American Congregation =

Former synagogue in Manhattan, New York

- Hebrew: שַׁעֲרֵי שָׁמַיִם, lit. 'Gates of Heaven'
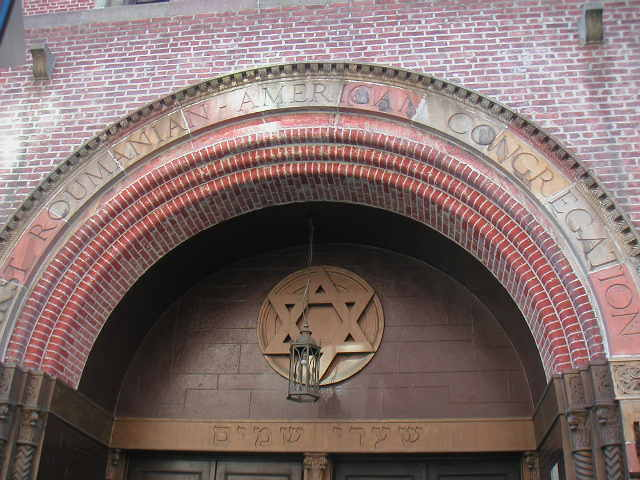
- Synagogue entrance in 2005, prior to its demolition

- Location of the former synagogue in Lower Manhattan

Religion
- Affiliation: Orthodox Judaism (former)
- Ecclesiastical or organisational status: Church (1860); Synagogue; Church; Synagogue (1902 – 2006)
- Status: Closed and demolished (2006)

Location
- Location: 89–93 Rivington Street, Lower East Side, Manhattan, New York City, New York
- Country: United States
- Coordinates: 40°43′12″N 73°59′20″W

Architecture
- Architects: J.C. Cady & Co. et al; Charles E. Reid
- Type: Synagogue
- Style: Romanesque Revival; Byzantine Revival
- Established: 1885 (as a congregation)
- Completed: c. 1860 (166 years ago)
- Demolished: March 3, 2006

Specifications
- Direction of façade: North
- Capacity: 1600–1800
- Length: 100 feet (30 m)>
- Width: 70 feet (21 m)
- Materials: Foundation: stone; Walls: brick; Roof: asphalt
- First Roumanian-American Congregation
- U.S. National Register of Historic Places
- Area: less than one acre
- NRHP reference No.: 98000239
- Added to NRHP: March 12, 1998

The First Roumanian-American Congregation, also known as Congregation Shaarey Shomayim (Hebrew: שַׁעֲרֵי שָׁמַיִם, lit. 'Gates of Heaven'), or the Roumanishe Shul (Yiddish for "Romanian synagogue"), was an Orthodox Jewish congregation at 89–93 Rivington Street on the Lower East Side of Manhattan in New York City. The congregation was organized in 1885 by Romanian-Jewish immigrants, serving the Lower East Side's large Romanian-Jewish community. The Rivington Street building, erected around 1860, switched between being a church and a synagogue and was extensively remodeled in 1889. The First Roumanian-American congregation purchased it in 1902 and again remodeled it.

The synagogue became famous as the "Cantor's Carnegie Hall", because of its high ceiling, good acoustics, and seating for up to 1,800 people. Yossele Rosenblatt, Moshe Koussevitzky, Zavel Kwartin, Moishe Oysher, Jan Peerce and Richard Tucker were all cantors there. Red Buttons sang in the choir, George Burns was a member, and Edward G. Robinson had his Bar Mitzvah there. The congregation's membership was in the thousands in the 1940s, but by the early 2000s had declined to around 40, as Jews moved out of the Lower East Side. Though its building was listed on the National Register of Historic Places in 1998, the congregation was reluctant to accept outside assistance in maintaining it. In December 2005, water damage was found in the structural beams, and services were moved to the living room of the rabbi's mother. In January 2006, the synagogue's roof collapsed, and the building was demolished two months later.

== Origins ==
=== First Roumanian-American/Congregation Shaarey Shamoyim ===
From 1881 through 1914, approximately 2 million Jews immigrated to the United States from Europe. An estimated three-quarters of them settled in New York City, primarily on the Lower East Side of Manhattan. Over 75,000 of these immigrants were from Romania, where Jews faced antisemitic laws, violence and expulsion. These hardships, combined with an economic depression influenced by low crop yields, resulted in 30 percent of the Jews in Romania emigrating to the United States.

Romanian Jewish immigrants in New York City gravitated to a fifteen-block area bounded by Allen, Ludlow, Houston and Grand streets. This "Romanian quarter" became the most densely populated part of the Lower East Side, with 1,500 to 1,800 people per block. These immigrants founded the First Roumanian-American congregation, also known as Congregation Shaarey Shamoyim.

The origins of the congregation are disputed; its establishment in 1885 may have been a re-organization of a congregation founded in 1860. Located initially close to the Romanian quarter at 70 Hester Street, and later situated at the heart of it with the move to Rivington Street, the synagogue was the preferred house of worship for the quarter's inhabitants.

=== Rivington Street building ===
The Rivington Street building was constructed as a Protestant church around 1860 by the Second Reformed Presbyterian Church, which served the area's large German immigrant community. In November 1864 the building was sold to the Orthodox German-Jewish Congregation Shaaray Hashomayim ("Gates of the Heavens"), which had been founded in 1841. Though its Hebrew name was essentially the same as that used by the First Roumanian-American congregation—Congregation Shaarey Shamoyim—which later purchased the building in 1902, the two congregations were unrelated.

By the late 1880s, the German-Jewish community had mostly moved from the Lower East Side. In 1889, Congregation Shaaray Hashomayim moved to 216 East 15th Street, near Second Avenue, selling the Rivington Street building to the New York City Church Extension and Missionary Society of the Methodist Episcopal Church, which built or purchased churches, missions, and Sunday schools in New York City.

The Church Extension and Missionary Society engaged J. Cleaveland Cady to design major alterations to the structure. Cady was, at the time, New York's most famous church architect, and had designed many other public institutional buildings, including university buildings, hospitals and museums. His work included the original Metropolitan Opera building (since demolished), the Richardsonian Romanesque West 78th Street wing of the American Museum of Natural History, and several other buildings for the Church Extension and Missionary Society. The renovations cost approximately $36,000 (today $1,290,000), and included an entirely new Romanesque Revival facade in the reddish-orange brick that Cady also used on several other churches.

Renamed the Allen Street Methodist Episcopal Church (or Allen Street Memorial Church), the Rivington Street building's new purpose was to "attract Jewish immigrants seeking conversion". It was, however, unsuccessful in this endeavor. In 1895, the church's pastor stated, "The existence of the church here attracts few. Our audiences are small, and contain almost no Jews."

== Purchase and renovation by First Roumanian-American ==
In 1902, the First Roumanian-American congregation/Congregation Shaarey Shamoyim purchased the Rivington Street building from the Church Extension and Missionary Society to satisfy a need for a larger building to serve the Lower East Side's rapidly growing Romanian-Jewish population. At the time, the property was valued at $95,000 (today $3.54 million). The funds for the purchase were raised from the members of the congregation, and to honor those contributing $10 or more, names were engraved on one of four marble slabs in the stairway to the main sanctuary. The most generous gift was $500, at a time when $10 was two weeks' pay. The congregation also took out two mortgages; one for $50,000 (today $1.86 million) with the Title Insurance Company, and a second for $30,000 (today $1,120,000) with the Church Extension and Missionary Society.

The congregation commissioned Charles E. Reid for extensive renovations, at a cost of $6,000 (today $223,000). The "eclectic Byzantine" remodeling involved converting it for Jewish use by removing Christian symbols and adding a Torah ark and bimah (central platform from which the Torah is read) at the sanctuary's north end. The renovations retained the original "horseshoe-shaped gallery supported by twelve Ionic columns" and wooden pews with reading shelves (likely from the 1889 Cady renovation), but a number of structural changes were made. Steel beams were added to support the weight of the ark and bimah, the rear wall was re-built and the gallery extended to meet it, two skylights were added (a concave stained glass one and a clear glass one over the ark), and at the front of the building, on top of the shallow (14 feet deep) fourth-story attic, an equally shallow fifth-story attic was added.

The completed structure filled almost the entire width of its approximately 70-foot-wide (21 m) by 100-foot-deep (30 m) lot, and seated 1,600 to 1,800. Dedicated in late December 1902, it was the Lower East Side's largest synagogue and only Romanesque one, and it became an "architectural and public showpiece".

== Early activities ==
By 1903 the synagogue was well established on Rivington Street, and, due to its capacity and prominence, was often the site of significant or mass meetings. In April 1903 a service to honor the memory of Reform rabbi and Zionist leader Gustav Gottheil was held there, and a similar service was held for Theodor Herzl the following year. At the latter service, which was boycotted by Orthodox rabbis, Herzl was not eulogized, nor was his name mentioned.

The Union of Orthodox Jewish Congregations of America (UOJCA) held its third annual convention at the synagogue in June 1903, attended by around 100 delegates, and presided over by the organization's president, Rabbi Henry Pereira Mendes. The most important resolutions adopted at that meeting were one that deprecated the granting of a get (religious divorce document) to—or allowing subsequent re-marriage by—people who had not first obtained a civil divorce, and the request that congregations with mostly foreign-born members "secure an English-speaking rabbi". At the meeting Albert Lucas also spoke out strongly against attempts by Christian groups to proselytize Jewish children in nurseries and kindergartens. Ostensibly to combat this proselytization, in 1903 the congregation was one of several New York City synagogues that allowed Lucas the use of its premises for free religious classes, "open to all children of the neighborhood".

In December 1905 a mass meeting was held at the synagogue to protest massacres of Jews in Russia and mourn their deaths, and the congregation donated $500 to a fund for the sufferers. In March 1909 Orthodox groups held meetings there to organize opposition to the constitution and make-up of Judah Leon Magnes's Kehilla, an overarching organization intended to represent all of New York's Jews, which lasted until 1922. A mass meeting of local residents and businessmen to combat Lower East Side gangsters was held at the synagogue in 1913.

The Rivington Street synagogue was also a preferred venue for airing issues relevant specifically to Romanian-American Jews. In 1905 it was the site of New York City's only memorial service honoring United States Secretary of State John Hay, who had worked on behalf of oppressed Jews in Romania. In 1908, the synagogue hosted a meeting of over 30 religious organizations representing Romanian-American Jews, at which the formation of a federation of those organizations was proposed, and again in 1916 hosted a similar meeting of "two hundred delegates representing thirty-five organizations ... to plan incorporation of the American League of Rumanian Jews". At the latter meeting steps were taken to raise $1,000,000 (today $30 million) for oppressed Jews in Romania, and to campaign for their "equal rights and their emancipation from thralldom".

The congregation carried out extensive charity campaigns during the Passover season; by 1905 the congregation was distributing wagon-loads of matzos to poor Jews so they could celebrate the holiday. By 1907–1908 membership had risen to 500 (up from 160 in 1900), the Talmud Torah had 250 students, and the synagogue's annual revenues were $25,000 (today $860,000). The congregation ran into financial difficulties of its own in 1908, and in October of that year raised funds by selling a number of its Torah scrolls in a public auction.

Members who would become famous included George Burns and Bucharest-born Edward G. Robinson, who had his Bar Mitzvah there in 1906. Robinson would later laugh that his propensity for taking the stage was demonstrated when he gave the longest Bar Mitzvah speech in the history of the congregation—"but the men sat still and listened". In 1911 First Roumanian-American celebrated its ten-year jubilee at the synagogue. Guest speakers included United Synagogue of America president Solomon Schechter, Congressman Henry M. Goldfogle, and the principal speaker was William Jay Gaynor, then Mayor of New York City. Membership had grown to 350 families by 1919. The congregational school held classes daily, and had 4 teachers and 300 students. The American Jewish Year Book listed the synagogue's rabbi as Abraham Frachtenberg, a well-known cantor.

== "Cantor's Carnegie Hall" ==
The synagogue's sanctuary had a high ceiling and "opera house" characteristics, and was renowned for its "exquisite" or "magnificent" acoustics. Known as "the Cantor's Carnegie Hall", First Roumanian-American became a center for cantorial music, and many of the greatest cantors of the 20th century led services there. Yossele Rosenblatt, Moshe Koussevitzky, Zavel Kwartin and Moishe Oysher all sang there, as did Jan Peerce and Richard Tucker before they became famous opera singers. Having a reputation for good cantorial singing had a positive impact on a synagogue's finances; congregations depended on the funds from the sale of tickets for seats on the High Holy Days, and the better the cantor, the greater the attendance.

Red Buttons sang at the synagogue with Rosenblatt in 1927, and when visiting the synagogue almost 70 years later could still remember the songs. Though his family actually went to a "small storefront synagogue", Buttons was discovered, at age eight, by a talent scout for Rosenblatt's Coopermans Choir, who heard him singing near the intersection of Fifth Street and Avenue C, at a "pickle stand". Buttons would sing in the choir for three years. Eddie Cantor has also been claimed as a choir member, though this is less likely.

Oysher—"the greatest of all popularizers of cantorial singing"—became the synagogue's cantor in 1935, and the congregation's membership peaked in the 1940s, when it numbered in the thousands. In a 1956 interview by Brendan Gill in The New Yorker magazine, Oysher described First Roumanian-American as "the most orthodox Orthodox synagogue in town". Oysher died of a heart attack two years later "at the young age of 51". The week of his death, he had said, "half-jokingly", that he wanted only one person to deliver his eulogy: Chaim Porille, rabbi of the First Roumanian-American Congregation. Porille had been born in Uścieczko (then in Austria-Hungary) in 1898, and moved to the United States in 1927, to serve as rabbi of the United Hebrew Congregations of Providence, Rhode Island. He became rabbi of First Roumanian-American in 1932, a post he filled until 1962, and was a member of the executive board of the Agudath Harabonim. He died in September 1968.

== Subsequent renovations and appearance ==
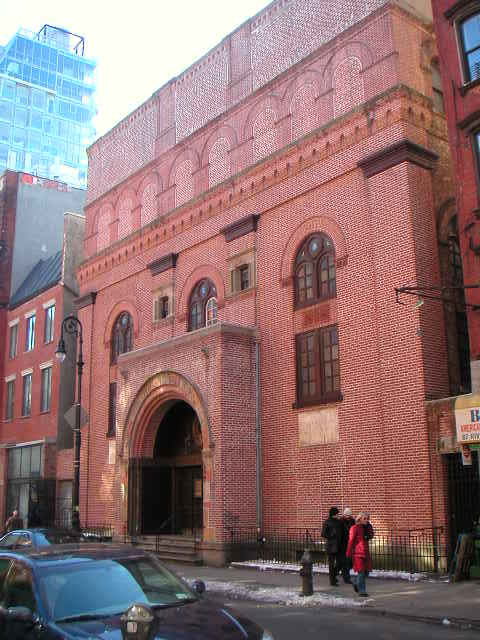
First Roumanian-American synagogue building on Rivington Street

In the years following First Roumanian-American's initial purchase and renovation of the Rivington Street building, the congregation made a number of other structural alterations. These included:

- 1916–1917: Adding fire escapes on the east and west sides of the building.
- 1920s or later: Installing individual theatre-style seats in the gallery.
- 1938–1943: Removing the staircase to the fourth floor, leaving access only from the fire escapes.
- 1948–1950: Reconstructing the portico with some of the existing stone and brick, and adding new "fireproof steel stairs with terrazzo treads" and light-yellow and blue tinted glass windows on the east and west walls of the sanctuary, and other improvements.
- 1964: Adding a kitchen to the basement "for social purposes".

In the 1990s, the north-facing orange-red brick facade presented a large, compound arched brick and stone portico, with deeply recessed doors. This arch was "supported by three carved columns, two twisted columns, and a central column with a chevron pattern, each with a Byzantine-style capital", and had a stone coping on top. Carved into the portico arch in capital letters were the words "First Roumanian-American Congregation" in English.

Originally there were large rectangular window openings on the ground floor on each side of the portico, each divided into two windows, but these had been bricked in by the 1990s. The second- and third-floor windows above them were originally stained glass but later clear glass, each second-floor window having eight square panes, and each third-floor window six panes topped with an arch. "Ornamental red terra cotta panels" separated the second- and third-floor openings. On the third floor, centered above the portico, was a similar window, this one flanked by two short recessed twisted columns, each "supporting a stone lintel incised with a cupid's-bow ornament". Similar lintels capped three-story pilasters at each corner of the facade, and these pilasters and lintels extended around the northeast and northwest corners. The six-paned windows were each capped with a roundel and three spandrels, "two large and one small", and these retained their original stained glass.

The shallow fourth floor was demarcated on the bottom by "a heavy frieze and corbelled brick cornice", which supported "eight round-arched windows with molded brick voussoirs ... massed in a 3-2-3 pattern". By the 1990s these had also been bricked in. The attic on top of the fourth floor, added during the 1902–1903 renovations, was "capped by a band of small red terra-cotta blocks". The sides of the building were faced with plain brick, and flanked by narrow alleys with iron gates at each entrance. The walls generally had plain windows, though there was a round arched one on each side of the fourth floor. One fire escape remained, in the east alley. Inside, the building held a two-story balconied main sanctuary and dining room, in addition to the basement kitchen and bathrooms. The heating system was in a sub-basement. The front ark and wood bimah in the sanctuary were ornate; the red velvet draped ark was elaborately decorated, and the bimah was also decorated, and supported a large bronze candelabra. The sanctuary floor was wood, with wood wainscoting and plaster walls.

=== Appearances in media ===
The synagogue building can be seen in the 1956 film Singing in the Dark, starring Oysher, and also starring (and produced by) Joey Adams. The entrance can be seen in the panoramic photograph of the corner of Ludlow and Rivington streets found on the Beastie Boys' 1989 Paul's Boutique album cover foldout.

== Decline ==
Over time the synagogue appealed to a broader constituency than just Roumanian-American Jews. Nevertheless, membership declined during the latter half of the 20th century as the upwardly mobile Jewish population of the Lower East Side moved to north Manhattan, Brooklyn, and the Bronx. First Roumanian-American was particularly affected: as it was an Orthodox congregation, in order to attend Sabbath services its members had to live within walking distance. In 1980 First Roumanian-American was one of the few congregations on the Lower East Side to still have its own Talmud Torah. This school had been housed in a small building on the east side of the synagogue that had formerly served as the church rectory. The congregation was eventually forced to sell the building, but the new owners retained the school's carved sign.

Rabbi Mordecai Mayer, who had led the congregation for 20 years, died in 1981, two days before his 66th birthday. Born in Chortkov (then in Austria-Hungary), he had graduated from the Chachmei Lublin Yeshiva, and had emigrated to the United States in 1936. He had, for 40 years, conducted programs on Jewish topics on radio station WEVD, then owned by The Forward. In the 1970s he was a columnist for the Yiddish weekly Algemeiner Journal, and was the author of the English-language books Israel's Wisdom in Modern Life (1949) and Seeing Through Believing (1973). He was succeeded by Jacob Spiegel.

In the early 1990s the congregation could still be assured of the required quorum of ten men for the minyan during the week, as local businessmen attended the morning and evening prayers before opening and after closing their shops. By 1996, however, the membership was down to around two dozen, and Spiegel began holding services in the small social hall in the basement, as the main sanctuary had become too expensive to maintain. With the decline in membership, the building deteriorated. In 1997 the congregation received a grant for preservation and repair of the structure from the New York Landmarks Conservancy, and the following year received $4,000 from the Landmarks Conservancy's Sacred Sites program for roof truss repairs. That same year the synagogue building was listed in the National Register of Historic Places at the local level. In the fall of that year Shimon Attie's laser visual work Between Dreams and History was projected onto the synagogue and neighboring buildings for three weeks.

Spiegel had a heart attack and died in 2001, leaving charge of the synagogue to the youngest of his three sons, Rabbi Shmuel Spiegel. The other sons, Rabbi Gershon and Rabbi Ari, were, respectively, synagogue president and assistant rabbi. In June 2003 the name "Rabbi Yaakov Spiegel Way" was given collectively to the corner of Rivington Street and Ludlow Street near the synagogue location and the stretch of Rivington in front of the synagogue. The roof had long been in bad shape by the time of Jacob Spiegel's death in 2001 and it was threatening to collapse. In December of that year, Shmuel Spiegel managed to raise $25,000 for emergency repairs. However, despite offering cholent (the traditional Sabbath lunch stew) at the Sabbath morning kiddush, Spiegel had to search local streets to make the ten men for the minyan. In 2004 the regular membership hovered around 40. Spiegel kept the synagogue running at an annual cost of around $75,000.

== Collapse ==
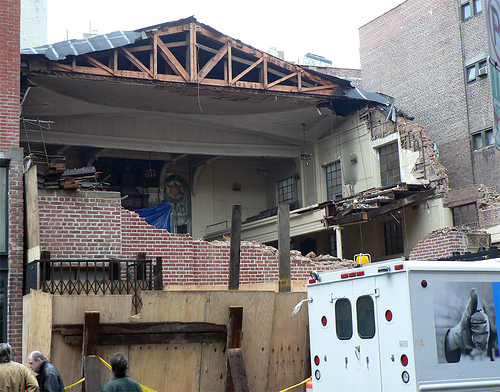
Demolition of the Rivington Street building

On January 22, 2006, the roof of the synagogue caved in, severely damaging the main sanctuary. Joshua Cohen, writing in The Forward in 2008, described the roof as "falling in respectfully, careful not to disturb the local nightclubs, or the wine and cheesery newly opened across the street". No one was injured, and a party to celebrate that fact was later held at the Chasam Sopher Synagogue on Clinton Street.

The National Trust for Historic Preservation issued a press release about the collapse, in which it described "older religious properties, like the First Roumanian-American Synagogue" as "national treasures", and stated:

The roof collapse at First Roumanian–American Synagogue this week demonstrates that houses of worship must have access to necessary technical assistance, staff and board training, and the development of new funding sources in order to save these landmarks of spirituality, cultural tradition, and community service.

Amy Waterman, executive director of a project to repair and renovate the Eldridge Street Synagogue, noted in The Forward:

Synagogues like the First Roumanian-American Congregation, more familiarly known as the Rumanische shul, were the first spiritual homes for successive waves of European immigrants. They were built more than 100 years ago, and just like the bridges and tunnels of New York City, they're bound to fail if not attended to.

Though First Roumanian-American had hosted a wedding as recently as October 30, 2005, the sanctuary had not been in regular use for over 10 years as a result of the difficulty maintaining it. Services had been held instead on a lower floor, and by autumn 2005 the roof was so porous that on Yom Kippur—even in the basement—they prayed "with buckets". After a contractor found water damage in the ceiling beams in early December, the three Spiegel brothers had been holding services in their mother Chana's apartment at 383 Grand Street, where they placed the congregation's 15 Torah scrolls following the roof cave-in. The synagogue's historic ark was also retrieved from the ruins. According to Shmuel Spiegel, "the insurance company [was] playing hardball."

Because the building had never been registered as a National Historic Landmark, after the collapse it was demolished on March 3, 2006. The New York City Department of Buildings said that the decision to demolish was the congregation's, but congregational vice president Joshua Shainberg said the Department of Buildings had left them no choice: "The Department of Buildings told us, 'You are to demolish it or we are to demolish it.' There were figures of up to $1.5 million for demolition." At the time of the building's collapse, the Spiegel brothers vowed that it would be re-built, but not nearly as large: "perhaps 20 feet high by 60 feet deep by 75 feet wide, which would cost about $2 million to $3 million".

Richard Price described the collapsed building in his novel Lush Life, writing that, after the demolition, only the rear wall with a Star of David in stained glass remained: "The candlesticks were standing up in the rubble, and the whole place looked like an experimental stage set—like Shakespeare in the Park." By October 2007 all that was left was "an empty lot dotted with weeds and crushed bricks". In a 2008 addendum to his book Dough: A Memoir, Mort Zachter described the remains as "a multimillion dollar real estate opportunity masquerading as a vacant, weed-strewn lot".

== Controversy ==
The collapse of the roof, and subsequent destruction of the synagogue, generated widespread concern and criticism among preservationists, who blamed Jacob and Shmuel Spiegel—a charge the family rejected.

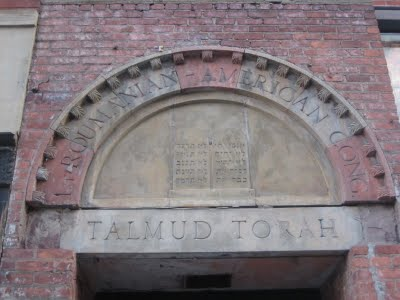
Carved stones from the arch of the entrance to the collapsed First Roumanian-American synagogue and its former Talmud Torah, incorporated into the entrance of the building next door at 95 Rivington Street

Julia Vitullo-Martin, senior fellow at the Manhattan Institute and director of its Center for Rethinking Development, stated that First Roumanian-American's roof collapse and subsequent destruction dramatized an "ongoing though undocumented synagogue crisis—particularly in poor neighborhoods" and revealed a broader problem peculiar to Jewish houses of worship:

Since Judaism, unlike Catholicism, lacks a hierarchy that could keep track of how many [synagogues] are abandoned and demolished, the breadth of the problem is more difficult to ascertain.

In the years preceding the building's collapse, the congregation had received offers of assistance from the New York Landmarks Conservancy, the National Trust for Historic Preservation, Lower East Side Conservancy, and the New York State Office of Parks, Recreation and Historic Preservation, though reports on the amounts and types of assistance offered varied. The congregation, then under the leadership of Jacob Spiegel, rejected them. Joel Kaplan of the Lower East Side Conservancy stated that the congregation "didn't want the several hundred thousand dollars in landmarking grants that went to other Lower East shuls, money that could have kept the shul in repair".

The reasons given for this rejection also varied. According to Vitullo-Martin, writing in The Wall Street Journal, Shmuel Spiegel was not sure why the offers were rejected, as the records were "buried in the rubble". Vitullo-Martin speculated that congregants might have hesitated to agree to a condition that they would need permission from the state for any sale or alteration of the building during the following 20 years. According to The New York Times, Spiegel stated that the repairs required were so extensive that the congregation could not have made them even with this financial assistance. According to The Jewish Week, Spiegel stated that the congregation "didn't want outside interference", was "uncomfortable with the idea of being landmarked and having to answer to landmark guidelines", and was also uncomfortable with making part of the building into a "museum of past glory", as others nearby had done.

Zachter writes:

A few blocks away, the Eldridge Street Synagogue survives. Why this synagogue was renovated, and the First Roumanian torn down, is a question for the rabbis and the historians.
