= Rivington Street =

Street in Manhattan, New York

Coordinates: 40°43′10.86″N 73°59′13.82″W

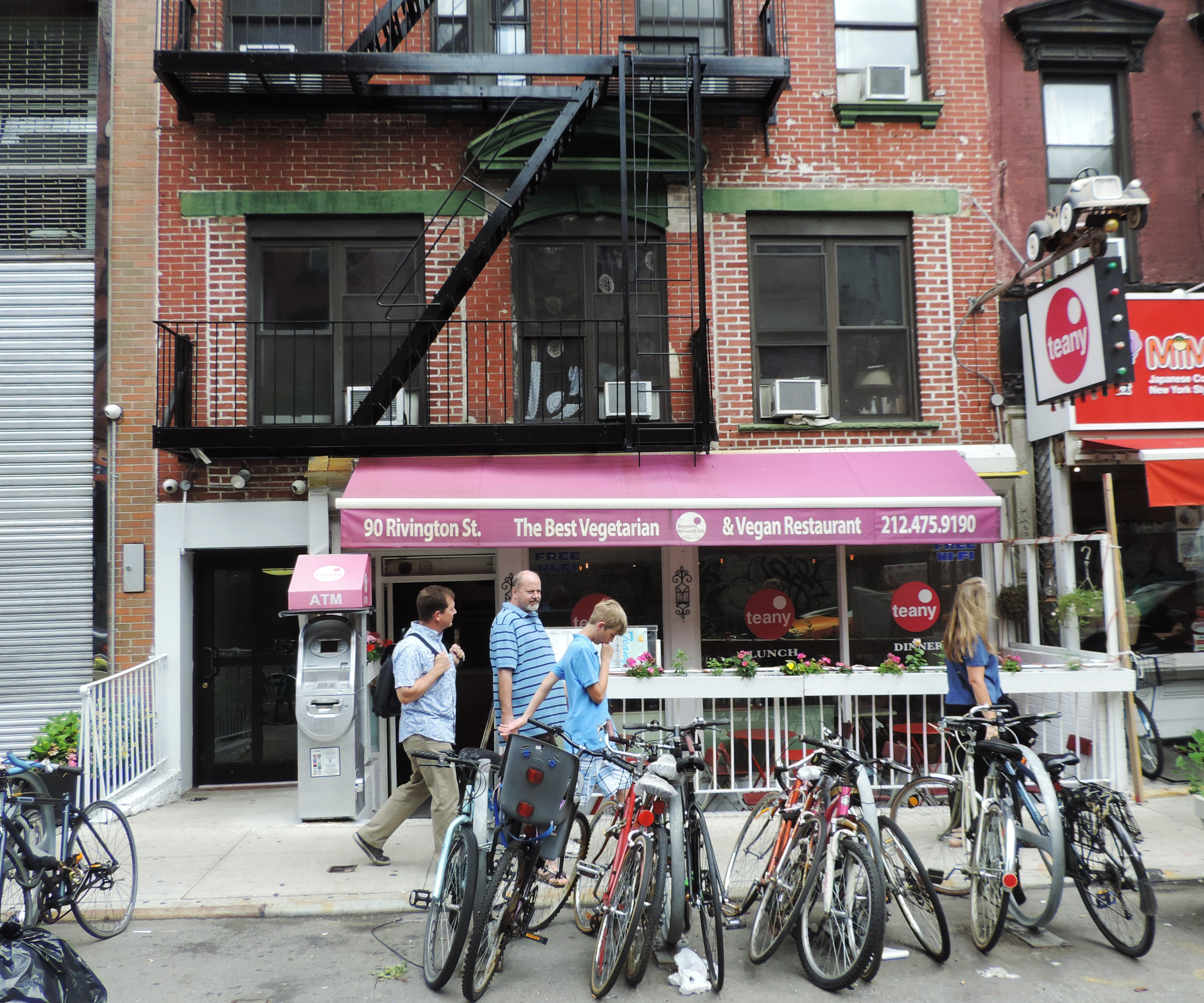
Cafe on Rivington Street

Rivington Street is a street in the New York City borough of Manhattan, which runs across the Lower East Side neighborhood, between the Bowery and Pitt Street, with a break between Chrystie and Forsyth for Sara D. Roosevelt Park. Vehicular traffic runs west on this one-way street.

It is named after James Rivington, who under cover of writing one of the most infamous Loyalist newspapers in the American colonies, secretly ran a spy ring that supplied George Washington with information. Early in the 20th century, the street was the home of many Italian and Jewish immigrants, hence the birthplace of many second generation Italian and Jewish Americans. George Burns lived there for a time.

== Points of interest ==
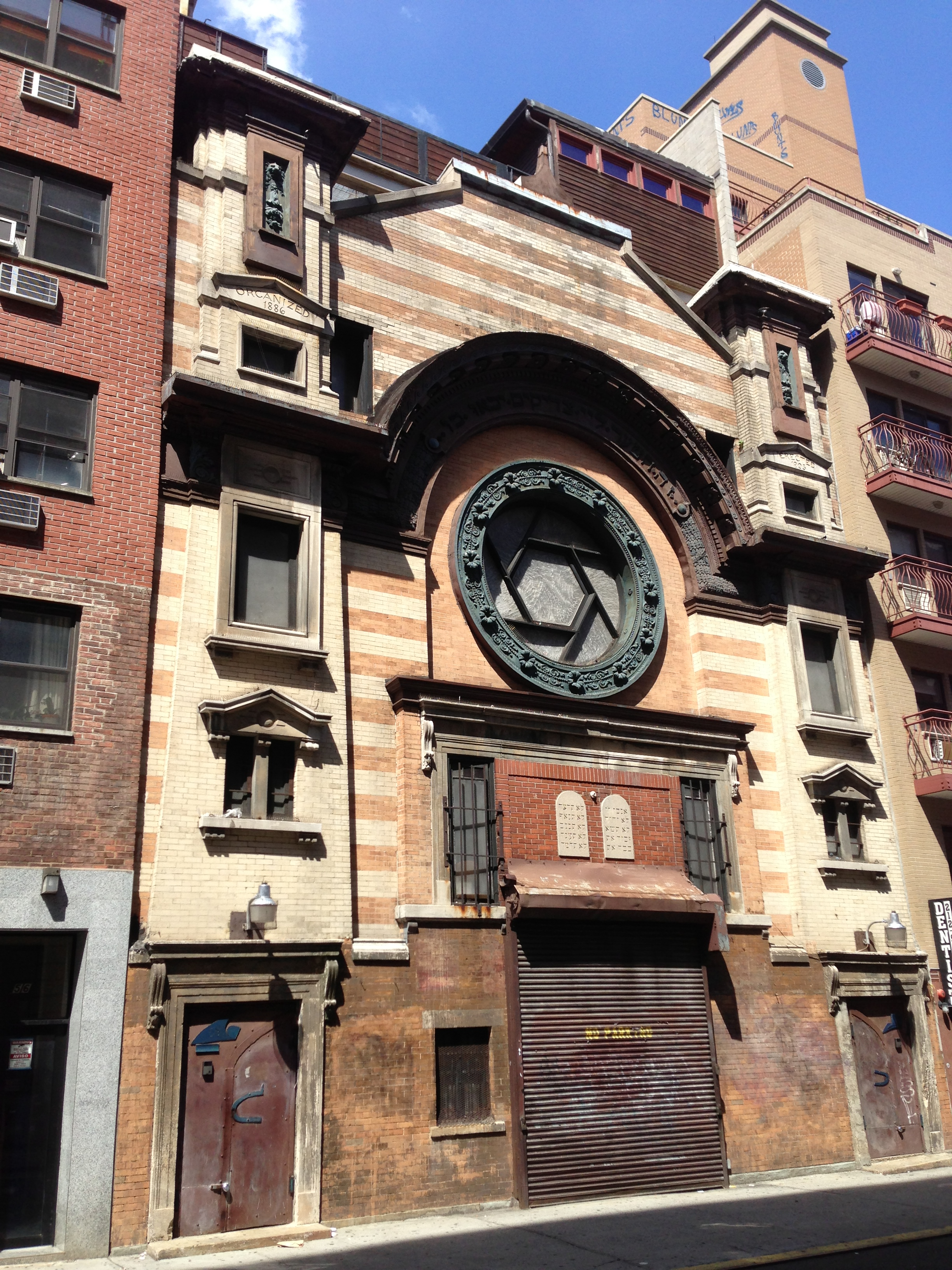
First Warsaw Congregation, 58 Rivington Street

The site of the second African burial ground in New York lies between Rivington and Stanton Streets, now a playground in the Sara D. Roosevelt Park. The M'Finda Kalunga community garden is also at this location. Several functioning synagogues remain on Rivington Street, a reminder of the large Jewish immigrant population that once inhabited the Lower East Side.

The synagogue of the First Roumanian-American Congregation existed from about 1860 until 2006. The Rivington Street municipal bath was located on Rivington Street from 1900 to 1975.

In the early 1980s, Rivington Street between Essex and Bowery earned notoriety as a "drug supermarket" famous for "having the best drugs in the city."

Rivington Street is a cross street to the Lower East Side's main thoroughfares. It has, in recent years, become part of an area known as "Hell Square"; there is a high saturation of restaurants and bars along the street.

Once home to the Rivington School of artists, notable establishments on Rivington Street include the University Settlement House (the first settlement house in New York), the Rivington Street Settlement house (established 1889), the no wave art center and hardcore punk rock venue ABC No Rio, the Clemente Soto Velez Cultural and Educational Center, and the newly constructed 21-story Hotel on Rivington.

== In popular culture ==
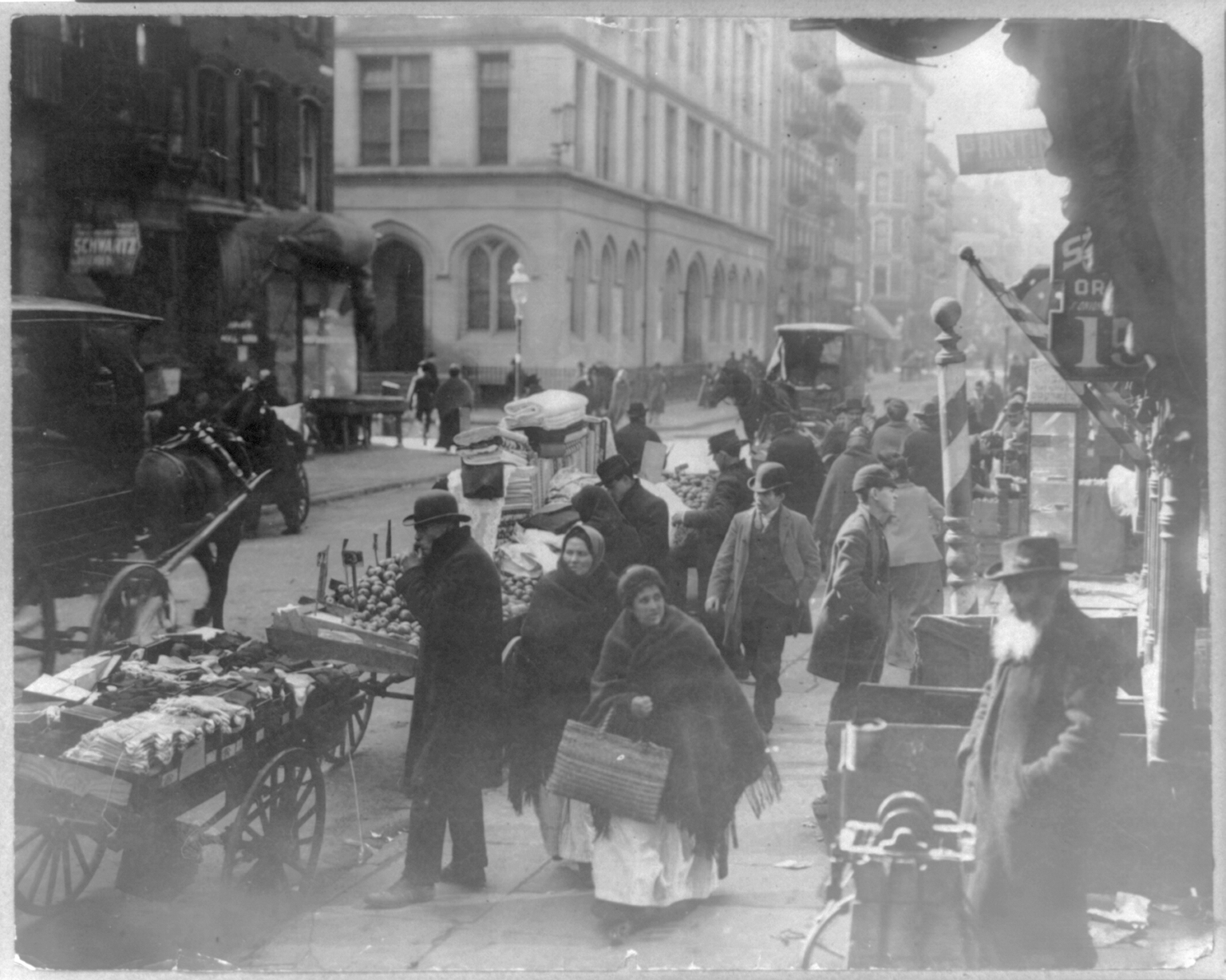
Rivington Street in 1910 by George Grantham Bain

Rivington Street was used for the cover to the Beastie Boys' album Paul's Boutique. The intersection of Rivington and Ludlow Street, where the cover photo was taken, was renamed "Beastie Boys Square" on September 9, 2023.

The Rivington School art movement was named after an abandoned public school building located on Rivington Street.

In 1979, Genya Ravan wrote and recorded her autobiographical song "202 Rivington Street", the address being where her family settled after their escape from the Holocaust in 1947. Like much of her work, including "Jerry's Pigeons" from her 1978 album Urban Desire, the ballad contains numerous references to neighborhood landmarks, including Pitt Street Park. "Laundry on strings hanging from iron bars with nowhere to escape" - From "202 Rivington Street" by Genya Ravan (1979): "Oh darlin, the New York City Jammed my Brain, all I get from this city is heat and my heaters don't care".

D.W. Griffith's 1910 film In the Ghetto begins in Rivington Street. There are authentic sequences of the Rivington Street markets in that film, corresponding with the photography of George Grantham Bain in the inset above.

The novel Rivington Street by Meredith Tax tells the story of a Jewish immigrant family from Russia's life on the Lower East Side in the early twentieth century.

In Moyshe Nadir's 1932 Yiddish poem, "Rivington Strit" (Rivington Street), the poet meets an old Jewish peddler who extemporizes a poetic history of the area.

In the movie A Hatful of Rain (1957), the main characters live in an apartment at 967 Rivington (apartment 3H).

In the novel What Makes Sammy Run?, the protagonist Sammy Glick turns out to have lived on Rivington Street at the beginning of his career, then named "Samuel Glickstein", when he is hired as a copy boy by The New York Record. The street is described by the narrator as one of a conglomerate of "jumbled ghetto streets" into which millions of Jews are crowded.

Lady Gaga makes mention of The Rivington Rebels, a group of local area partiers, in her 2011 studio album Born This Way. The lyrics, from the track "Heavy Metal Lover", are as follows, "Dirty pearls and a patch for all The Rivington Rebels. Let's raise hell in the streets, drink beer, and get into trouble."

In Fantastic Beasts: The Secrets of Dumbledore, Rivington Street is revealed to be the location of Jacob's bakery.
