= Jetta Goudal =

Dutch-American actress

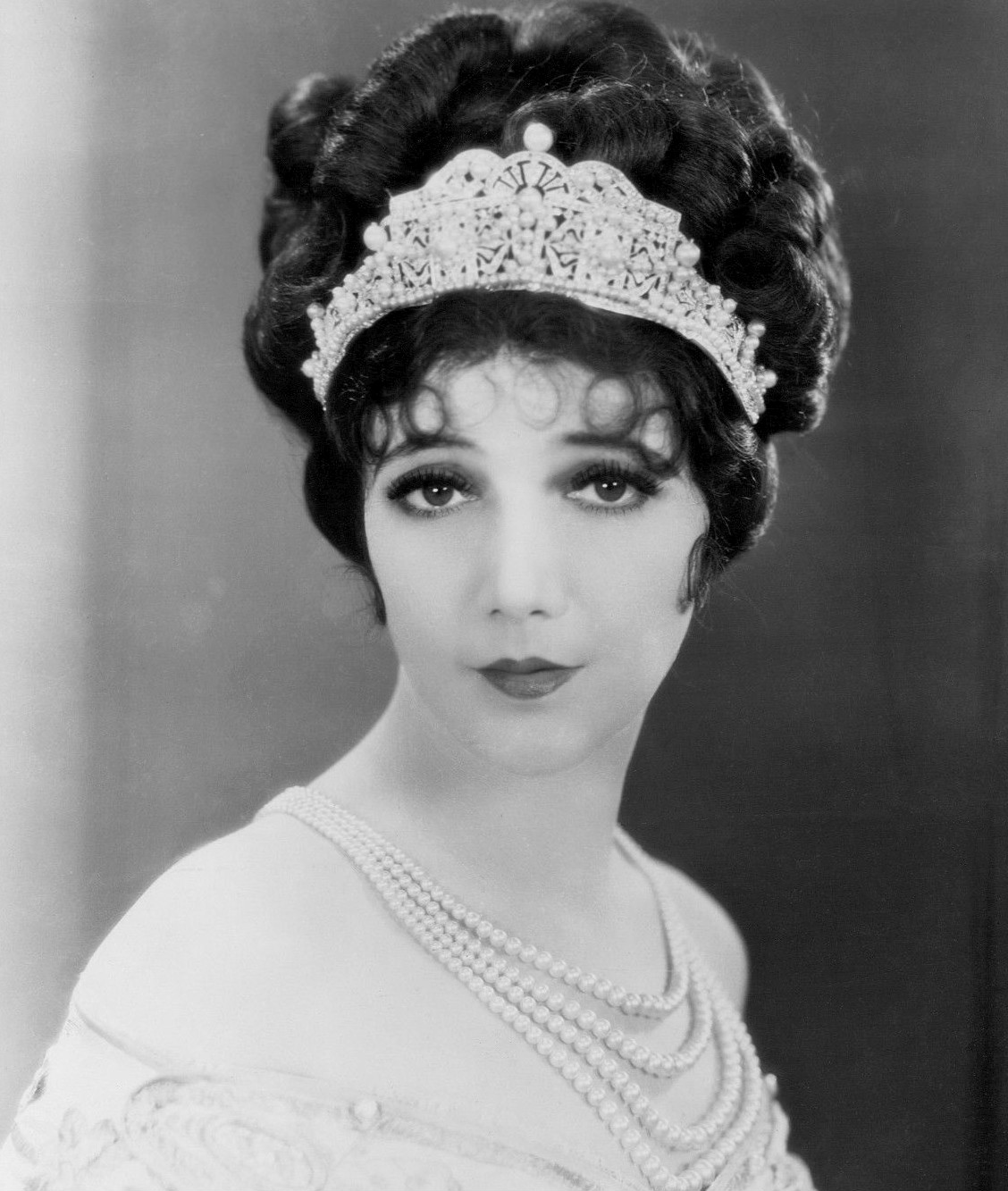
- Goudal in Lady of the Pavements, 1929
- Born: Julie Henriette Goudeket; July 12, 1891; Amsterdam, Netherlands
- Died: January 14, 1985 (aged 93); Los Angeles, California, U.S.
- Resting place: Forest Lawn Memorial Park, Glendale
- Occupation: Actress
- Years active: 1918–1932
- Spouse: Harold Grieve (m. 1930)

Jetta Goudal (/ˈʒɛtə/, born Julie Henriette Goudeket; July 12, 1891 – January 14, 1985) was a Dutch-American actress, successful in Hollywood films of the silent film era.

== Early life ==
Goudal was born on July 12, 1891, the daughter of Geertruida (née Warradijn; 1866–1920) and Wolf Mozes Goudeket (1860–1942), a wealthy diamond cutter, in Amsterdam. Her parents were both Jewish, and her father was Orthodox. She had an older sister, Bertha (1888–1945), and a younger brother, Willem, who died when he was 4 months old in 1896. Her father remarried in 1929 to Rosette Citroen (1882–1943). Almost all of her Dutch-Jewish relatives met the same fate. Only the daughter of her sister Bertha survived The Holocaust.

Tall and regal in appearance, she began her acting career on stage, traveling across Europe with various theater companies. In 1918, she left World War I-era devastated Europe to settle in New York City in the United States, where she hid her Dutch Jewish ancestry, generally describing herself as a "Parisienne" and on an information sheet for the Paramount Public Department she wrote that she was born at Versailles on July 12, 1901 (shaving 10 years off her age as well), the daughter of a fictional Maurice Guillaume Goudal, a lawyer.

== Career ==
She first appeared on Broadway in 1921, using the stage name Jetta Goudal. After meeting director Sidney Olcott, who encouraged her venture into film acting, she accepted a bit part in his 1922 film production Timothy's Quest. Convinced to move to the West Coast of the United States, Goudal appeared in two more Olcott films in the ensuing three years.

Goudal's first role in motion pictures came in The Bright Shawl (1923). She quickly earned praise for her film work, especially for her performance in 1925's Salome of the Tenements, a currently (2022) lost film based on the Anzia Yezierska novel about life in New York's Jewish Lower East Side. Goudal then worked in the Adolph Zukor and Jesse L. Lasky co-production of The Spaniard, and her growing fame brought her to the attention of producer/director Cecil B. DeMille.

Goudal appeared in several highly successful and acclaimed films for DeMille and became one of the top box-office draws of the late 1920s. DeMille later claimed that Goudal was so difficult to work with that he eventually fired her and cancelled their contract. Goudal filed a lawsuit for breach of contract against him and DeMille Pictures Corporation. Although DeMille claimed her conduct had caused numerous and costly production delays, Goudal won the suit in a landmark ruling when DeMille was unwilling to provide his studio's financial records to support his claim of financial losses.

Goudal appeared in 1928's The Cardboard Lover, produced by William Randolph Hearst and Marion Davies. In 1929, she starred in Lady of the Pavements, directed by D. W. Griffith, and in 1930, Jacques Feyder directed Goudal in her only French-language film, a made-in-Hollywood production titled Le Spectre vert.

== Later career ==
Because of her audaciousness in suing DeMille and her high-profile activism in the Actors' Equity Association campaign for the theatre and film industry to accept a closed shop, some of the Hollywood studios refused to employ Goudal. In 1932, at age forty-one, she made her last screen appearance in a sound movie, co-starring with Will Rogers in the Fox Film Corporation production of Business and Pleasure.

== Personal life and death ==
In 1930, she married Harold Grieve, an art director and founding member of the Academy of Motion Picture Arts and Sciences. When her film career ended, she joined Grieve in running a successful interior design business. They remained married until her death in 1985 in Los Angeles. She is interred next to her husband in a private room at the Great Mausoleum, Sanctuary of the Angels, at Forest Lawn Memorial Park Cemetery in Glendale, California.

In 1960, for recognition of Goudal's contribution to the motion picture industry, she was honored with a star on the Hollywood Walk of Fame at 6333 Hollywood Blvd.

On April 19, 2019, the city council of Amsterdam renamed bridge 771, previously without a name, the Jetta Goudal bridge. In early 2020, the name tag was installed.

== Holocaust ==
Jetta Goudal lost nearly all her relatives in the Holocaust. Her sister Bertha died in 1945 in Bergen-Belsen concentration camp, and Bertha's husband Nathan Beffie died at the same place in 1944. Jetta's nephew Eduard Beffie (Berta's son) was killed at Sobibór extermination camp. Jetta Goudal's stepmother, Rosette Citroen, was also killed at Sobibor in 1943. Only Bertha's daughter, Geertruida (Truus) Beffie survived the war and died in 2013 in Pennsylvania, United States.

== Filmography ==
Year	Title	Role	Notes
1922	Timothy's Quest		
1923	The Bright Shawl	La Pilar	
1923	The Green Goddess	Ayah	
1924	Open All Night	Lea	
1925	The Spaniard	Dolores Annesley	Lost film
1925	Salome of the Tenements	Sonya Mendel	Lost film
1925	The Coming of Amos	Princess Nadia Ramiroff	
1925	The Road to Yesterday	Malena Paulton	
1926	Three Faces East	Miss Hawtree / Fraulein Marks	
1926	Paris at Midnight	Delphine	
1926	Her Man o' War	Cherie Schultz	
1927	Fighting Love	Donna Vittoria	
1927	White Gold	Dolores Carson	
1927	The Forbidden Woman	Zita Gautier	
1928	The Cardboard Lover	Simone	
1929	Lady of the Pavements	Countess Diane des Granges	
1930	Le Spectre vert		
1932	Business and Pleasure	Madame Momora	
