= Hungry Hearts =

"Hungry Heart" is a song by Bruce Springsteen from his album The River.

Hungry Heart or Hungry Hearts may also refer to:

== Film and television ==
- A Hungry Heart, 1917 silent film drama directed by Emile Chautard
- The Hungry Heart, 1917 silent drama directed by Robert G. Vignola
- Hungry Heart, 1987 romance directed by Luigi Acquisto
- "Hungry Heart", 2001 episode of the T.V. show Frasier
- Hungry Hearts (1916 film), 1916 silent comedy featuring Oliver Hardy
- Hungry Hearts (1922 film), 1922 film directed by E. Mason Hopper, based on short stories by Anzia Yezierska
- Hungry Hearts (2014 film), 2014 drama directed by Saverio Costanzo

== Other uses ==
- Hungry Heart: Wild Striker, Japanese soccer manga and anime series
- "Hungry Hearts" (Nause song), 2012 single by Nause
- Hungry Hearts (short story collection), 1920 collection of short stories by Anzia Yezierska
- Hungry Hearts (The Searchers album), 1988
