= Hungry Heart (disambiguation) =

"Hungry Heart" is a song by Bruce Springsteen.

Hungry Heart may also refer to:

== Songs ==
- "Hungry Heart" (Steve Aoki and Galantis song), 2023
- "Hungry Heart" (Loïc Nottet song), 2017

== Film and television ==
- Hungry Heart (film), a 1987 Australian film
- "Hungry Heart" (Frasier), a 2001 episode of the sitcom Frasier
- Hungry Heart: Wild Striker, a Japanese manga and anime series

== See also ==
- Hungry Hearts (disambiguation)
