= Jennie Gerhardt =

1911 novel by Theodore Dreiser

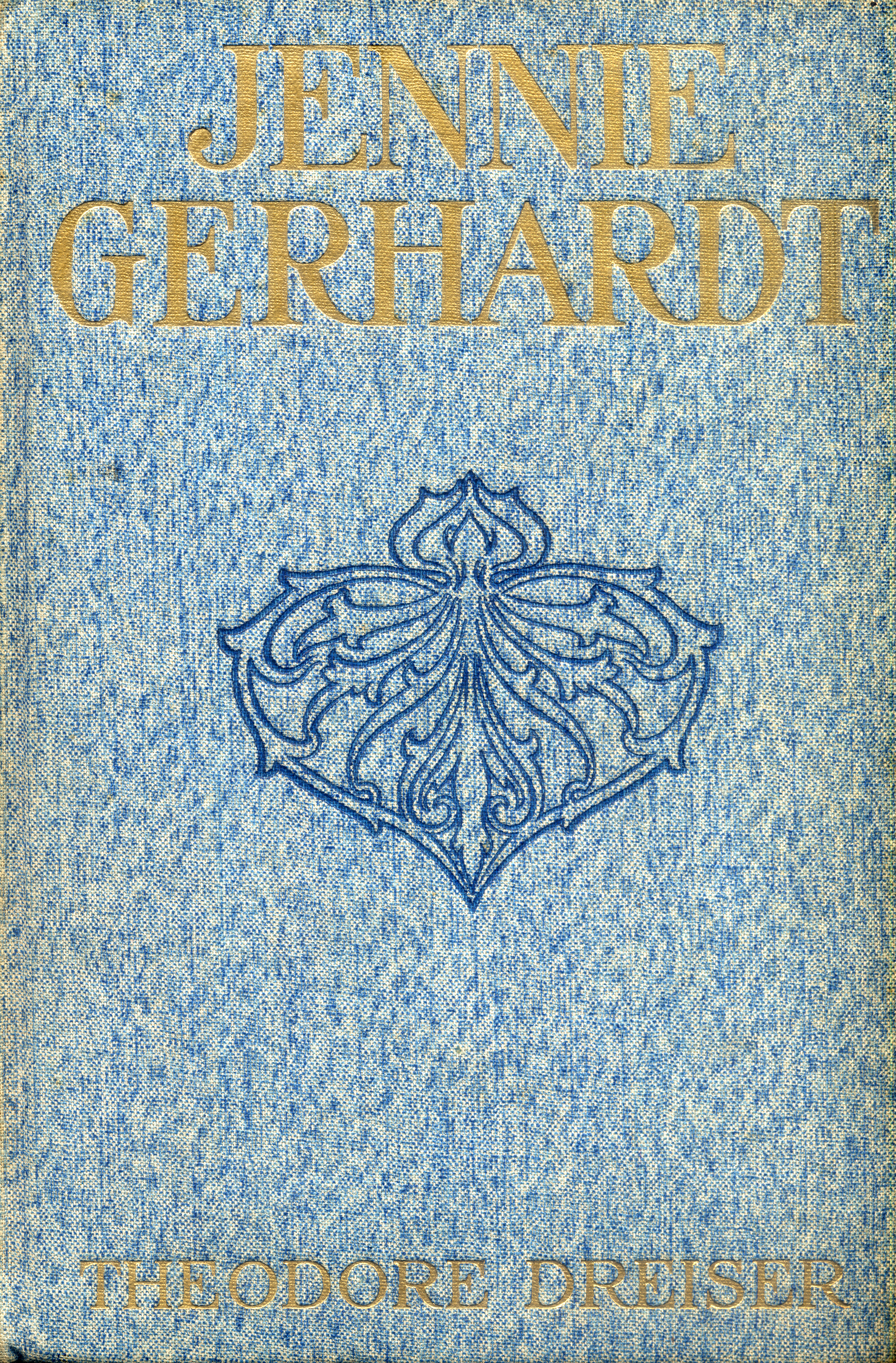
- First edition cover
- Author: Theodore Dreiser
- Language: English
- Genre: Fiction
- Publisher: Harper & Brothers
- Publication date: 1911
- Publication place: United States

Jennie Gerhardt is a 1911 novel by Theodore Dreiser.

== Plot summary ==
Jennie Gerhardt is a destitute young woman. While working in a hotel in Columbus, Ohio, Jennie meets George Brander, a United States Senator, who becomes infatuated with her. He helps her family and declares his wish to marry her. Jennie, grateful for his benevolence, agrees to sleep with him. He dies before they marry, and Jennie is pregnant.

She gives birth to a daughter, Vesta, and moves to Cleveland with her mother. There she finds work as a lady's maid in a prominent family. In this home, she meets Lester Kane, a prosperous manufacturer's son. Jennie falls in love with him, impressed by his strong will and generosity. She leaves her daughter in Cleveland and travels to New York with Kane. He does not know of her illegitimate daughter and wants to marry Jennie. But because of their difference in class, he anticipates his family's disapproval and decides to take her as his mistress.

They live together successfully in the university neighborhood of Hyde Park, Chicago. After three years, Jennie tells him that Vesta is her daughter. Kane does not yield to his family's pressure to leave Jennie. But, after his father's death, he learns that his inheritance of a substantial part of the family business is conditioned on his leaving her. On hearing the will's terms, Jennie demands they separate for his sake.

During their trip to Europe, Kane meets Letty Gerald Pace, an affluent widow. Bowing to pressure from Jennie and his family, he decides to marry. After providing financially for Jennie, he marries Letty, resuming his former social status. Jennie loses her daughter to typhoid fever and adopts two orphans. She continues to love Kane.

He becomes seriously ill and tells Jennie he still loves her. She tends him until his death, and mourns secretly at his funeral.

== Characters ==
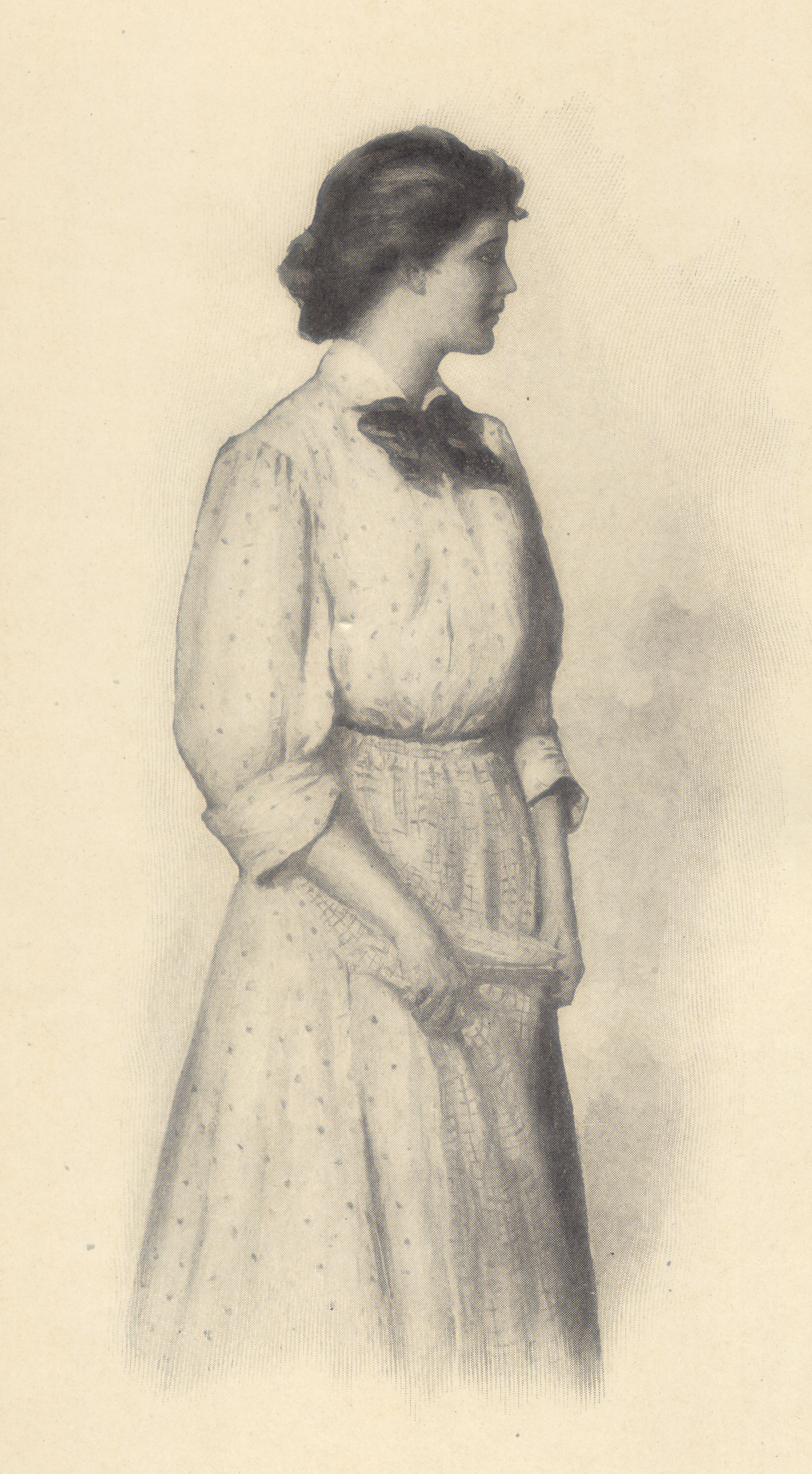
Illustration in Harper & Brothers edition

- Jennie Gerhardt, the protagonist. She starts work as a charwoman in a hotel in Columbus. Later she works as a maid in Cleveland. After Lester leaves her, she moves to Sandwood, a small town close to Chicago. Full name Genevieve.
- Mrs Gerhardt, Jennie's mother.
- William Gerhardt, Jennie's father. He is German. He works as a glass blower. He is ill at the outset of the novel. Later, he moves to Youngstown, Ohio when his family move to Cleveland, Ohio upon Sebastian's exhortation. Eventually, he moves to Chicago with Jennie and Lester after his other children have left him. He is a staunch Lutheran and makes a point to baptize Vesta. He dies of old age.
- Sebastian Gerhardt, Jennie's brother. He is described as a dandy who is ashamed of his family's lack of wherewithal. He is also known as Bass.
- George, Martha, William, Veronica, Jennie's other siblings.
- Senator Brander, a middle-aged United States Senator who falls for Jennie and leaves her pregnant. He dies of typhoid before they can marry.
- Wilhelmina Vesta, known as Vesta, Jennie and Brander's illegitimate child. Jennie and her mother hide Vesta from Jennie's father until he joins them in Cleveland. Later, she hides Vesta from Lester. The child later dies of typhoid fever.
- Doctor Ellwanger, the Gerhardts' practitioner in Columbus.
- Pastor Wundt, the Gerhardts' Lutheran pastor in Columbus.
- Mrs Bracebridge, Jennie's employer in Cleveland. Her husband is named Henry.
- Lester Kane, Jennie's second lover. He meets Jennie as he is visiting his longtime friend Mrs Bracebridge.
- Archibald Kane and Mrs Kane, Lester's parents. Archibald is a manufacturing magnate.
- Robert Kane, Lester's brother. He is described as a shrewd businessman. Although the two men part ways after their father's death, Robert apologizes by the end of the novel.
- Amy, Imogene, and Louise, Lester's sisters.
- Mrs Jacob Stendhal, Mr & Mrs Carmichael Burk, Mrs Hanson Field, Mrs Timothy Ballinger, Mrs Crag, Mrs Sommerville, neighbours of Jennie and Lester's in South Hyde Park.
- Samuel E. Ross, a real estate dealer Lester works with. He ends up losing a lot of money in the deal.
- Letty Pace, an affluent widow whom Lester marries.
- Mrs Davis, a fifty-year-old matron who helps Jennie when Vesta dies.
- Rose Perpetua and Henry Stover, two orphans whom Jennie adopts after Vesta dies.

== Allusions to other works ==
Dreiser likens Jennie and Lester's relationship to William Shakespeare's Romeo and Juliet in Chapter 41. At Sandwood, Jennie is said to read Washington Irving's Sketch Book, Charles Lamb's Elia, and Nathaniel Hawthorne's Twice Told Tales, classics of the nineteenth century.

== Literary significance and criticism ==
Dreiser first entitled his novel The Transgressor, before abandoning it in 1903, because of a nervous breakdown. He took it up again in 1910 He is believed to have based his character of Jennie on elements of his sisters Mame and Sylvia.

Years later in an interview with Claude Bowers, Dreiser said that he did not really like this novel.

H.L. Mencken wrote to Dreiser of his thought that Jennie was informed by the eponymous character in Thomas Hardy's Tess of the d'Urbervilles; Dreiser confirmed his insight.

Based on discovered material that had been removed to avoid censorship, a new edition of Jennie Gerhardt, including restored text, was published in the 1990s. This stimulated new critical writing about the novel. Critic Susan Albertine compared Letty Pace to Nettie McCormick. Arthur D. Casciato wrote about Dreiser's representation of German culture. He also suggested that this novel anticipated Anzia Yezierska's Bread Givers (1925), in showing the transition of a young woman away from a traditional immigrant culture.

== Film adaptation ==
The novel was made into a film directed by Marion Gering in 1933.

== In popular culture ==
The novel is referenced by Harvey Pekar in the film American Splendor. The novel is mentioned as one of "several excellent American novels" mentioned by "a critic named Mencken" in the novel This Side of Paradise (1920) by F. Scott Fitzgerald.
