= Salome of the Tenements =

1925 film by Sidney Olcott

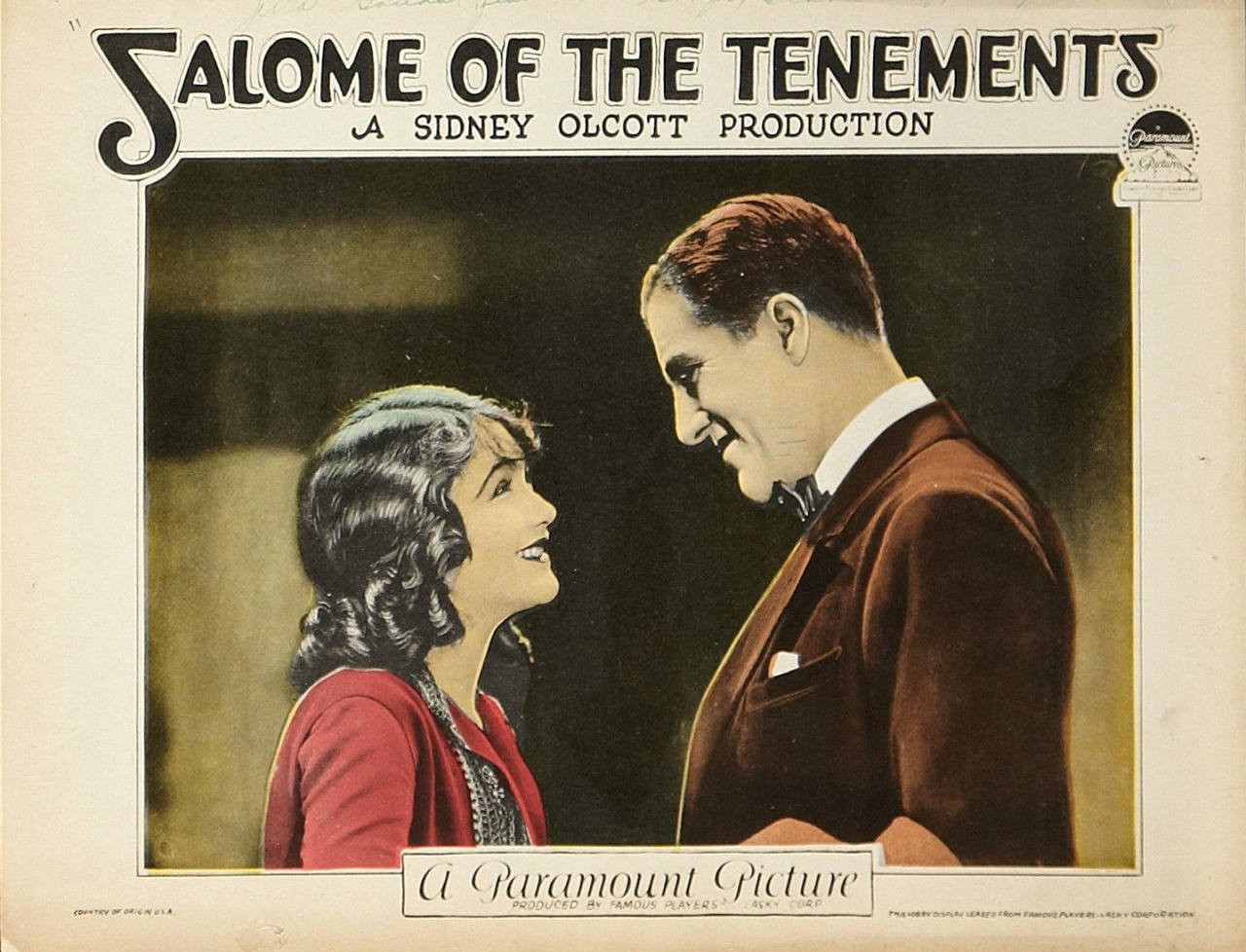
- Lobby card
- Directed by: Sidney Olcott
- Written by: Sonya Levien
- Based on: Salome of the Tenements by Anzia Yezierska
- Produced by: Jesse L. Lasky; Adolph Zukor
- Starring: Jetta Goudal; Godfrey Tearle; José Ruben
- Cinematography: David W. Gobbett; Al Liguori
- Distributed by: Paramount Pictures
- Release date: March 3, 1925
- Running time: 7 reels
- Country: United States
- Language: Silent (English intertitles)

Salome of the Tenements is a 1925 American silent drama film adapted to the screen by Sonya Levien from the Anzia Yezierska novel of the same name. Made by Jesse L. Lasky and Adolph Zukor's Famous Players–Lasky Corporation, a division of Paramount Pictures, it was directed by Sidney Olcott and starred Jetta Goudal and Godfrey Tearle.

The film, which was inspired by accounts of the real life of Rose Pastor Stokes, tells the story of poor immigrants living in New York's Jewish Lower East Side. It was shot at the Paramount Astoria studios.

== Plot ==
As described in a film magazine review, Sonya Mendel works at a Jewish newspaper. She interviews John Manning on the erection of a new settlement. He invites her to dinner and she borrows clothes from Jakey Salomon so that she looks presentable. She also borrows money from Banker Ben and in return she gives a note promising to repay $150 when she marries Manning. After she is married, Ben threatens to show Manning the note unless she "calls him off" from prosecuting Ben. When he learns of the note, Manning forgives his wife.

== Cast ==
- Jetta Goudal as Sonya Mendel
- Godfrey Tearle as John Manning
- José Ruben as Jakey Salomon
- Lazar Freed as Jacob Lipkin
- Irma Lerner as Gittel Stein
- Sonia Nodell as Mrs. Peltz
- Elihu Tenenholz as Banker Ben
- Fanny Weintraub as Mrs Solomon
- Nettie Tobias as The Widow

== Death of Fanny Weintraub ==
The movie used several elderly extras who were residents at the Home of Old Israel. The residents were told the morning of the premier that they were invited to attend, to see Fanny Weintraub's performance. Mrs. Weintraub was overwhelmed and died from the excitement.

== Preservation ==
With no prints of Salome of the Tenements located in any film archives, it is a lost film.
