= Harold Grieve =

American art director and interior designer

Harold Grieve (February 1, 1901 – November 3, 1993) was a motion picture art director and interior designer.

Born in Los Angeles, California, he attended Hollywood High School then studied art at the "School of Illustration and Painting" run by John Francis Smith in Los Angeles. In the early 1920s Grieve went to work in the film industry as a set designer and art director. He became one of the founding members of the Academy of Motion Picture Arts and Sciences and remained active all his life in the Academy's library of historical records.

Near the beginning of the 1930s, Grieve gave up working for a film studio to set up an interior design business. In 1932 his wife, former star of the silent era Jetta Goudal, whom he married in 1930, joined him in the business. Among other things, they designed the interior of a dream home for crooner Bing Crosby and the interior of Toujours Eblouissante, the Palm Springs estate of French opera star Lily Pons that was featured in Architectural Digest. As well, Grieve did the interior of actress Colleen Moore's famous dollhouse that toured the U.S. and which can now be seen on display at Chicago's Museum of Science and Industry.

Harold Grieve's wife died in 1985 in Los Angeles and he died there in 1993. They are interred together in a private room at the Great Mausoleum, Sanctuary of the Angels, at Forest Lawn Memorial Park Cemetery in Glendale, California.
