= According to Hoyle (film) =

1922 film by W. S. Van Dyke

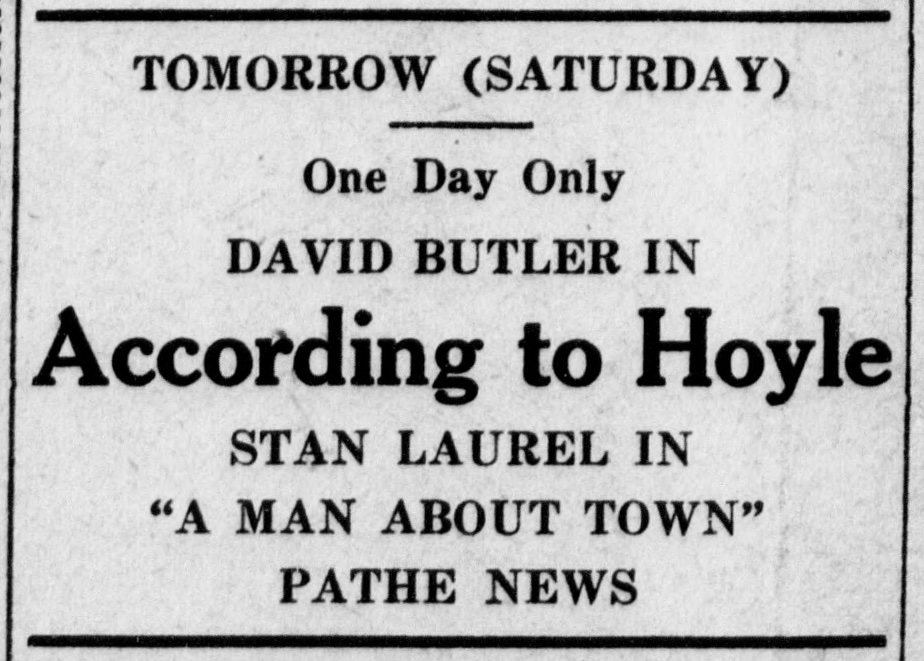
- Contemporary advertisement
- Directed by: W.S. Van Dyke
- Written by: John B. Clymer
- Story by: Clyde Westover; Lottie Horner
- Produced by: David Butler
- Starring: David Butler; Helen Ferguson; Philip Ford
- Cinematography: Arthur L. Todd
- Production company: David Butler Productions
- Distributed by: Western Pictures
- Release date: May 5, 1922
- Running time: 5 reels
- Country: United States
- Language: Silent (English intertitles)

According to Hoyle is a lost 1922 American silent adventure film directed by W.S. Van Dyke and starring David Butler, Helen Ferguson, and Philip Ford.

== Plot ==
As described in a film magazine, 'Boxcar' Simmons is tramping the railroad ties to nowhere when from a car window blows a set of rules telling how to be a success for life. The idea rather appeals to Simmons so he sets out to live by them, changing his hobo garb for better clothes for, as the rules state, "God helps those who help themselves." Simmons is mistaken for a millionaire mining man. Dude Miller and Jim Riggs set out to sell him a rock-studded farm. Simmons discovers that Doris Mead and her brother Jim were previously swindled by the two slickers. He "salts" the ranch and the slickers pay out a large sum to buy his option, thinking it to be a rich silver ore deposit. Simmons turns this money over to Doris and her brother. The slickers, finding that they have been tricked, crack the hotel safe and steal Simmons' wallet and its rules for success. Once safely away they open the wallet and find and read the last rule: "Once you get a good start -- keep going!"

== Cast ==
- David Butler as 'Boxcar' Simmons
- Helen Ferguson as Doris Mead
- Philip Ford as Jim Mead
- Fred J. Butler as Dude Miller
- Harry Todd as Jim Riggs
- Bud Ross as Silent Johnson
- Hal Wilson as Bellboy
- Sam Allen as Landlord
- Francis X. Bushman

== Production ==
Filming of According to Hoyle began in November 1921, and took place in Tehachapi, California and at the Burston Studios in Los Angeles. Filming was completed in January 1922.

== Reception ==
The Moving Picture World's reviewer T.S. daPonte was positive, praising David Butler's acting and saying of the intertitles "The originality in the wording of several of the sub-titles is especially to be commended."

Motion Picture News' Charles Larkin's review was also positive, describing the safe robbery and ensuing chase to be a production highlight.

== Preservation ==
With no holdings located in archives, According to Hoyle is considered a lost film.

== Bibliography ==
- Munden, Kenneth White. The American Film Institute Catalog of Motion Pictures Produced in the United States, Part 1. University of California Press, 1997.
