= Business and Pleasure =

1932 film

- Film poster
- Directed by: David Butler
- Written by: William M. Conselman; Arthur F. Goodrich; Booth Tarkington; Gene Towne
- Produced by: Al Rockett
- Starring: Will Rogers; Jetta Goudal
- Cinematography: Ernest Palmer
- Music by: George Lipschultz
- Production company: Fox Film Corporation
- Distributed by: Fox Film Corporation
- Release date: March 6, 1932
- Running time: 77 minutes
- Country: United States
- Language: English

Business and Pleasure is a 1932 American pre-Code comedy film directed by David Butler, starring Will Rogers and featuring Boris Karloff.

== Plot ==
Earl Tinker goes on a Mediterranean cruise and finds himself pursued by a femme fatale, hired by a business rival, while mediating a dispute between two Arab tribes.

== Cast ==
- Will Rogers as Earl Tinker
- Jetta Goudal as Madame Momora
- Joel McCrea as Lawrence Ogle
- Dorothy Peterson as Mrs. Tinker
- Oscar Apfel as P.D. Weatheright
- Vernon Dent as Charles Turner
- Boris Karloff as Sheik
- Mitchell Lewis as Hadj Ali
- Jed Prouty as Ben Wackstle
- Cyril Ring as Arthur Jones
- Peggy Ross as Olivia Tinker

== See also ==
- List of American films of 1932
- Boris Karloff filmography
