= Salome of the Tenements (novel) =

1923 novel by Anzia Yezierska

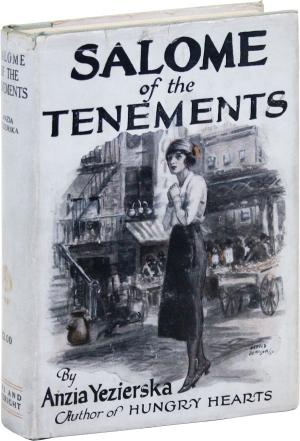
- Author: Anzia Yezierska
- Published: 1923 (Boni & Liveright)
- Publication place: United States

Salome of the Tenements is a 1923 novel by Jewish-American writer Anzia Yezierska. The story follows a young Jewish immigrant woman living in New York City who wishes to marry a wealthy Protestant and escape the confines of her lower-class upbringing.

Yezierska drew inspiration for the novel from the life of her friend Rose Pastor Stokes whose celebrated marriage to millionaire philanthropist J. G. Phelps Stokes was a New York "Cinderella" story in the early 20th century. Yezierska herself had a brief romance with the renowned American educator John Dewey that paralleled certain elements in the novel. Salome of the Tenements was published by Boni & Liveright and was adapted into a silent film of the same name in 1925.

== Synopsis ==
The protagonist, Sonya Vrunsky, is the daughter of Russian-Jewish immigrants living in the squalor of New York's Lower East Side. As the novel begins, she is working for a small Jewish newspaper, The Ghetto News. She travels to a wealthy Manhattan neighborhood to interview the millionaire philanthropist John Manning. He is widely known in the city for his charitable work in establishing a settlement house on the Lower East Side. Sonya is described as willful and emotional, but with a charismatic beauty that male characters in the novel find irresistible. She yearns to escape the impoverished world of the immigrant community. Sonya is immediately smitten with John and all that he represents (he is likewise taken with her but keeps his emotions hidden). She sets her sights on winning him and finally succeeds. In a case of "opposites attract", she uses her ethnic background as a Russian Jew to portray herself as exotic and exciting which ends up being, as she had hoped, appealing to the cool, reserved John.

Once married, however, Sonya soon realizes that the kind of life she desired for so long is not what she envisioned it would be. The wedding reception at the Manning mansion—where she is snubbed by John's Protestant family, and her lower-class Jewish wedding guests are made to feel unwelcome—is an awkward clash of cultures. She becomes unhappy in the marriage as John is revealed to be cruel and controlling. In the Introduction to the 1995 reissue of Salome of the Tenements, Gay Wilentz writes:

Sonya gets her man, but she finds that the gulf between them is unbridgeable and that the manner in which she must behave to be with him denies her very being.

Eventually, Sonya leaves John. By the end of the novel, she has bounced back, reinvented herself as a fashion designer, and married a fellow designer, also a Jewish immigrant, whom she truly loves.

== Reception ==
When first published, Salome of the Tenements received mostly negative reviews. Louise Field in The New York Times called Sonya "an illiterate, hot-blooded little savage". Scott Nearing in The Nation labeled Sonya a "devouring monster" and Yezierska's novel "an unwholesome book". In contrast, the historian James Harvey Robinson praised Salome of the Tenements for exposing John Manning as a hypocritical moralizer with his "facile, pompous generalizations and academic abstractions".
