= Home of Old Israel =

New York City assisted living facility

Coordinates: 40.698825°N 73.932535°W

The Home of Old Israel was a Jewish assisted living facility located in New York City.

== History ==
The Home of Old Israel was originally conceived as a "Home for old men and women" for members of the Society of Khal Chasidim. A building was purchased at 204 Henry Street in July 1922 from Joseph and Goldie Rothman for $75,000, to be used for this purpose.

The home was officially opened in March 1924, with more than 2,500 Jews in attendance. Congressman Samuel Dickstein and Assemblymen Samuel Mandelbaum and Peter J. Jammill addressed the crowd.

The original facility could accommodate 150 men and women in two dormitories, and contained a roof garden, a summer garden, a synagogue, two kitchens, two dining rooms and a hospital with a staff of twenty-one physicians. In 1927 a second building was reportedly purchased from the Rabbi Isaac Elchanan Theological Seminary, at the southeast corner of East Broadway and Scammel Street, for $82,000. The plan for renovations to be conducted for $400,000, and the new building was designed for 400 tenants by architect H. Hurwit.

However, in April 1929 the Home of Old Israel was relocated to 70 Jefferson Street, the former site of Beth Israel Hospital, (now Mount Sinai Beth Israel) which was purchased for $125,000. The procession between buildings was described as "one of the most picturesque parades that the east side has witnessed for many years." Thousands watched as the 82 tenants were relocated, including 12 who had to be carried on stretchers. "Most of them were women, all wearing white head kerchiefs." They were accompanied by a band, six Torah scrolls and "American and Jewish flags." They also chanted a hymn with the words of Psalms 71:9, "Cast us not off in our old age."

In September 1930, a fire damaged the facility, but the fire was controlled and the residents were kept safe. In the basement, $25,000 of food and linens were destroyed. 108-year-old Max Davidson was instrumental in keeping order. In the aftermath of the fire, a benefit was staged to raise money, with performances by George Jessel, Fannie Brice, Harry Richman and Lou Holtz, at the Mecca Temple. This became an annual event, later held in Madison Square Gardens and frequently attended by over 18,000 people. In 1942, the event starred the King Sisters, Benny Goodman, Chico Marx, Ella Fitzgerald and Bill Robinson.

In 1931, expansion began on Jefferson Street to double the home's capacity. In 1937, a new $50,000 hospital wing was opened, marked by a four mile parade.

In 1934, during the Great Depression, the directors of the Home of Old Israel decided to lower the minimum age to 60, to help accommodate those who had lost their jobs as a result.

In 1948, upon the declaration of the State of Israel, the residents held a special prayer session for the new state.

In 1965, construction began on a community high-rise apartment building for the elderly in Far Rockaway, to be known as Seagirt Village, containing four 17-story buildings with 1,024 apartments.

In the early 1970s, the Home of Old Israel was merged the Jewish Association for Serving the Aged (JASA). Bernard Warach describes this turn of events in his book, HOPE: A Memoir. As a representative of JASA, he writes that he was approached by Jack Singer, who had secured the land in Far Rockaway for Seagirt Village. By this time, he writes the Home of Old Israel was "decrepit." Singer had made a deal with D.C. 1199, the union at the Home of Old Israel, to provide security guards 24 hours a day for the new site. "The agreement was part of the price for closing the home without incurring large severance costs. Unfortunately Jack Singer had not secured government approval for funding the security guards as part of the Housing Company budgets. Consequently, their costs, $150,000 a year, had to be met by Home of Israel. Their board, aging, could not pay. It was at this point Jack Singer approached JASA to assume sponsorship of Seagirt Village, acquire title to the entire property, and assume a heavy financial responsibility."

== Activities ==
Every year a Passover seder was held for the residents, which was frequently reported on by the press. Chanukah parties were also held each year, and other Jewish holidays were marked as well.

In the 1940s and 1950s, the Home celebrated Brotherhood Week with an interfaith event, inviting Protestants and Roman Catholics for the day.

In the 1930s, residents were able to take WPA classes to improve their English. Two-week-long outings upstate were sponsored by the Home's Fresh Air Fund.

The Museum of Natural History occasionally held art shows that featured work from the residents.

In 1952, an exhibit was held at the Home in which ancient jewelry, glass, pottery, coins and other relics from Israel were put on display.

Weddings between residents occasionally took place. In 1952, two residents of the home, Nathan Soltas and Fannie Simon, ages 78 and 75, were married. In 1953 a double wedding was held, between Katie Goldstein and Charles Wanderman, and between Tillie Levine and Sol Rubinowitz.

Other family celebrations were also held and several mayors and politicians attended events at the Home.

== Leadership ==
Louis Singer was the founder and first president, serving until his death in 1937. His will created a $3,000 trust fund to provide residents with cigars and cigarettes. Upon his death, his son Jacob Singer became president.

Jacob Fuchs was another founder and served as secretary until his death in 1948. He was also a resident starting in 1936, following the death of his wife, Dora Fuchs.

Mrs. Harry Kass was also a founder, and served as a director. She died in 1956.

Benjamin Diamond was the vice president and Alexander Krawitz was the first superintendent.

Julius Newman served as treasurer until his death in 1958.

Robert M. Lindner was an executive director from 1947 until his death in 1959.

== Notable residents ==
In 1925, the oldest tenant was Jennie Freeman, 108 years old. She eventually died while napping after baking cakes for her 109th birthday. By 1930, the oldest person was Max Davidson, age 108. Chaim Abrahams held this title until his death at 110 in 1934, followed by Samuel Rothstein, who was 104 in 1934. By 1937, the oldest resident was Goldie Zwiebel, age 104. In 1944, the oldest was Alfred Glasstal, age 101, who pledged to sell $101,000 worth of US War Bonds for the war effort.

In 1925, in a widely reported incident, a resident of the home, Fanny Weintraub, age 85, served as an extra in the movie "Salome of the Tenements." When it was announced that the movie was premiering and all the residents would be taken to attend, The New York Times reported: "This announcement caused the breakfast table to buzz with strange excitement. The old men and women gesticulated as they discussed the news. "Fanny's in the movies on Broadway like a regular actress. And for pay! We're all going to see her. Yes!" In the midst of the excitement it was noticed that Mrs. Weintraub had slumped down in her chair. The thrill of anticipation had been too much for her. The house physician was called immediately, only to discover that she had died."

In 1931, a resident, Samuel Rothstein (age 93) impulsively went for a swim in the East River with several youths and needed to be saved from drowning. The same man went on another jaunt in 1933, disappearing for five hours, during which time, he explained, "I went for a walk in the sun."

Emil Boreo, a comedian, was a resident of the Home of Old Israel at the time of his death in 1951.

Over the years, a number of residents committed suicide by jumping from their windows. The first reported case was in 1930, when Chaim Levine, age 75, plunged to his death. In 1932, Samuel Dickstein did so at age 85. Sadie Glass, age 90, fell from her window in 1936. In 1944, Anna Rochblatt, 68, reportedly fell from her window.

== Statistics ==
In the 1930 census, 143 people are listed as "inmates" of the Home of Old Israel, 73 males and 70 females. (This excludes the seven people listed as inmates at the end, who are in fact the caretakers.)

In the 1940 census, 250 people are listed as "inmates" of the Home of Old Israel. The gender split is almost equal, with 120 females and 130 males. The average age is 77.3, with 40 people in their 60s, 113 in their 70s, 80 in the 80s, and 17 in their 90s. The youngest resident is 63, while the oldest is 99. Of the 250, 98 were living there for over five years. 49 were married (though mostly living in the home without their spouse), 5 divorced, 5 single and the rest were widows or widowers. The majority of residents were born in Russia, with additional residents born in Poland, Romania, Austria, Germany and one from Palestine.
