= Lady of the Pavements =

1929 film directed by D. W. Griffith

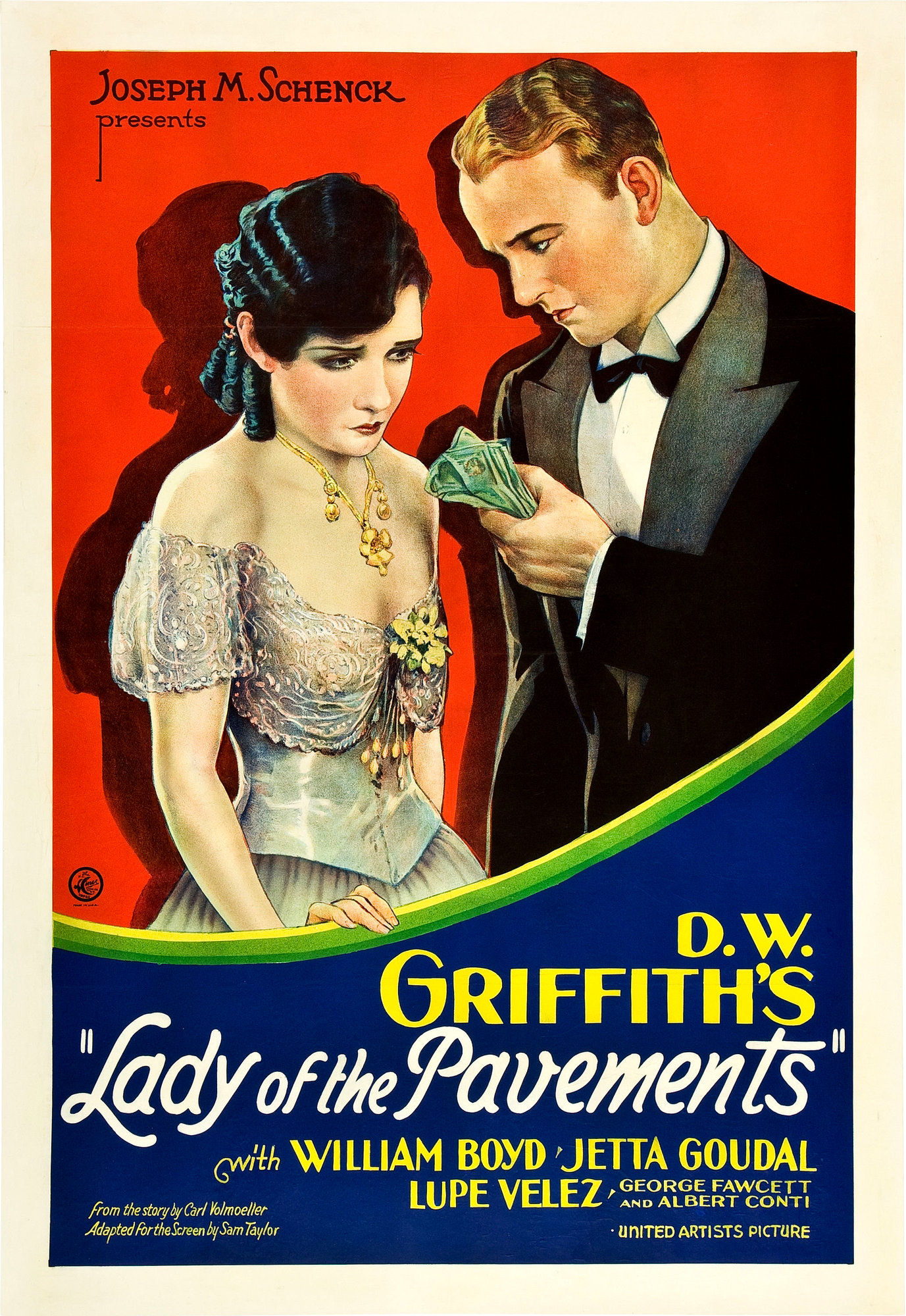
- Theatrical release poster
- Directed by: D. W. Griffith
- Screenplay by: Sam Taylor
- Based on: La Paiva by Karl Vollmöller
- Produced by: Joseph M. Schenck
- Starring: Lupe Vélez; William Boyd; Jetta Goudal
- Cinematography: Karl Struss
- Edited by: James Smith
- Music by: Irving Berlin
- Production company: Art Cinema Corporation
- Distributed by: United Artists
- Release date: January 22, 1929
- Running time: 85 minutes
- Country: United States
- Languages: Sound (Part-Talkie) (English intertitles)

Lady of the Pavements (UK title: Lady of the Night) is a 1929 American sound part-talkie romantic drama film directed by D. W. Griffith and starring Lupe Vélez, William Boyd, and Jetta Goudal. The screenplay was written by Sam Taylor, with contributions from an uncredited Gerrit Lloyd. While the film has a few talking sequences, the majority of the film features a synchronized musical score with sound effects using both the sound-on-disc and sound-on-film process.

== Plot ==
Disgusted that his fiancée, Diane has been cheating on him, Karl, says he'd rather marry a "street walker" than her. To get back at him, Diane arranges for Nanoni ("Little One"), a singer at a sleazy bar, to pretend to be a Spanish girl, from a convent, to fool him.

== Cast ==
- Lupe Vélez as Nanon del Rayon
- William Boyd as Count Karl Von Arnim
- Jetta Goudal as Countess Diane des Granges
- Albert Conti as Baron Finot
- George Fawcett as Baron Haussmann
- Henry Armetta as Papa Pierre
- William Bakewell as a pianist
- Franklin Pangborn as M'sieu Dubrey, dance master

== Music ==
The film featured a theme song entitled "Where Is The Song Of Songs For Me?" which was composed by Irving Berlin. Lupe recorded this song on Victor 21932.

== Preservation ==
The film survives in a mute print that required the use of the Vitaphone sound-on-disc system. Soundtrack discs for reels 6 and 8 survive in the UCLA Film and Television Archive. Additional soundtrack discs to this film were donated by Arthur Lennig to the George Eastman Museum Motion Picture Collection in Rochester, New York.

== See also ==
- List of early sound feature films (1926–1929)
