= Berg Orchestra =

Czech classical orchestra

- Orchestra
- Native name: Orchestr Berg
- Founded: 2001
- Location: Prague, Czech Republic
- Principal conductor: Peter Vrábel
- Music director: Peter Vrábel
- Website: www.berg.cz

Berg Orchestra (Czech: Orchestr Berg), initially formed as a group of like-minded music students in 1995 and officially founded in 2001 by Slovak conductor Peter Vrábel, is a professional orchestra in Prague, Czech Republic whose stated objective is "to constantly search for inspiration and accommodate new impulses from every sphere of contemporary life."

Aside from its performances in traditional concert halls, Berg performs in museums and sewage treatment facilities, on theater stages, in churches and synagogues, and sometimes accompanies silent film screenings or dance performances. The orchestra's director Eva Kesslová says choosing the spaces for the performances is an important aspect of their work.

== History ==
When Berg held its first season as an independent chamber orchestra in January 2001, the organizers were well acquainted with what they faced. "The music scene could be described as post-socialist", says Vrabel, who became Berg's conductor and artistic director. "Audiences rejected anything that was a bit more avant-garde, and many musicians looked at contemporary music with total disrespect. We had to learn how to live in freedom." Vrábel is a guest conductor at the National Theater in Prague.

== Collaborations ==
Collaboration is central to Berg Orchestra. International composers with whom the orchestra has closely worked include Heiner Goebbels, Fausto Romitelli, Lera Auerbach and many others, along with such renowned Czech figures as Marek Kopelent and Martin Klusák. The orchestra enjoys a longstanding collaborative association with the Spitfire dance theatre company. In 2018, Berg Orchestra collaborated on the world premiere of the Tiger Lillies' Bohemian Nights show in Prague.

== Films ==
In 2009, at the Spanish Synagogue in Prague, Berg premiered Jan Dušek's incidental music for E. Mason Hopper's 1922 silent film Hungry Hearts. featuring a live recording of Berg Orchestra premiering Jan Dušek's incidental music, official website.

== Nuberg Award ==
The competition gives out one Nuberg Award per year. The jury consists of distinguished figures from the international contemporary music world who, according to Vrábel, are entirely from outside the Czech Republic, and not only for the objectivity they provide. He told Česká pozice: "It's also for the young composers to have feedback from the international music scene".

== Outside awards and recognition ==
Peter Vrábel is a Gideon Klein Prize holder. In 2010, Vrábel and Berg Orchestra were commended for artistic excellence and the promotion of Czech music by the Czech section of the International Music Council of UNESCO.
