= The Bright Shawl =

1923 film by John S. Robertson

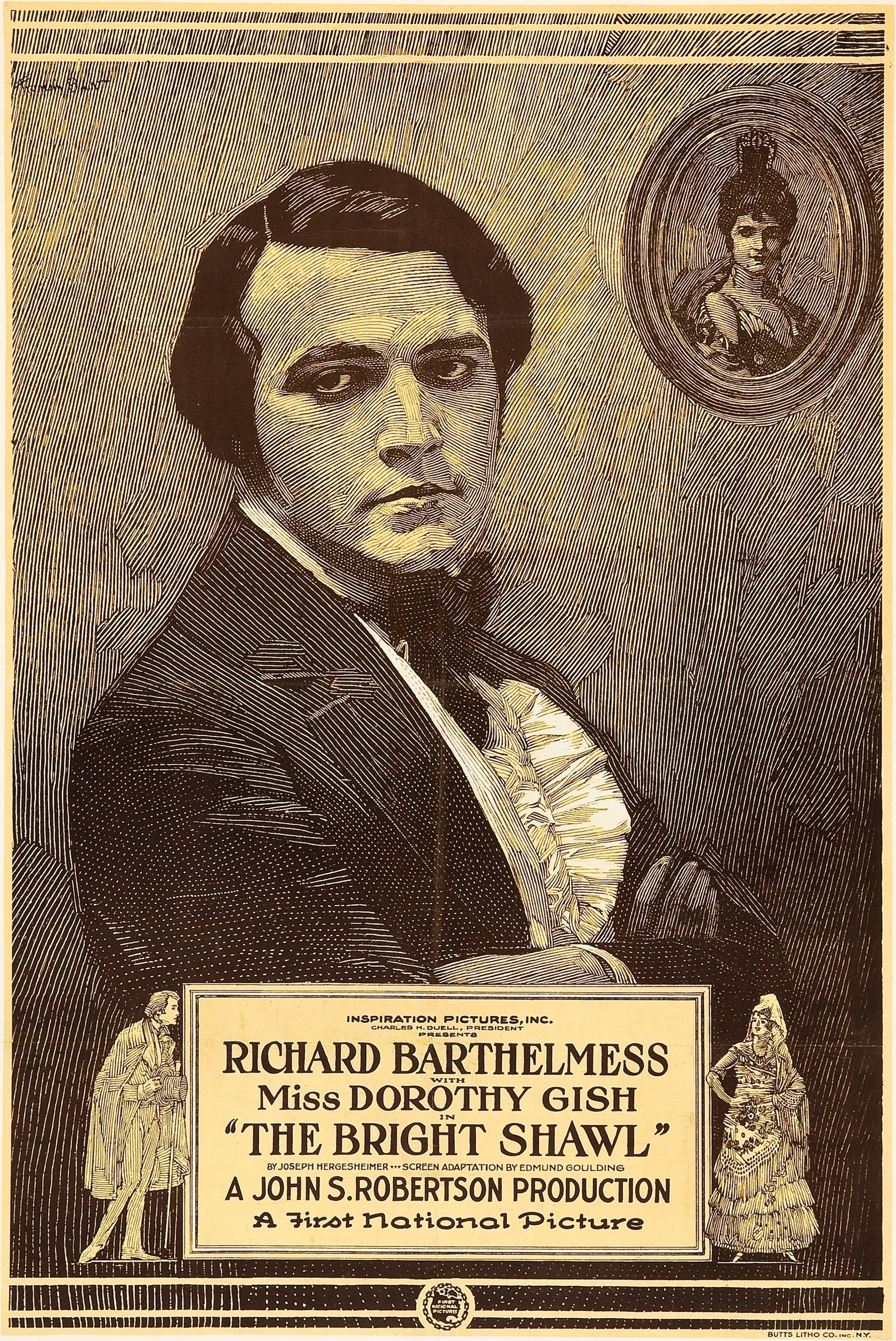
- Poster
- Directed by: John S. Robertson
- Written by: Edmund Goulding (scenario)
- Based on: The Bright Shawl by Joseph Hergesheimer
- Produced by: Charles H. Duell; Richard Barthelmess
- Starring: Richard Barthelmess; Dorothy Gish; Jetta Goudal
- Cinematography: George J. Folsey
- Edited by: William Hamilton
- Distributed by: Associated First National
- Release date: April 22, 1923
- Running time: 80 minutes
- Country: United States
- Language: Silent (English intertitles)

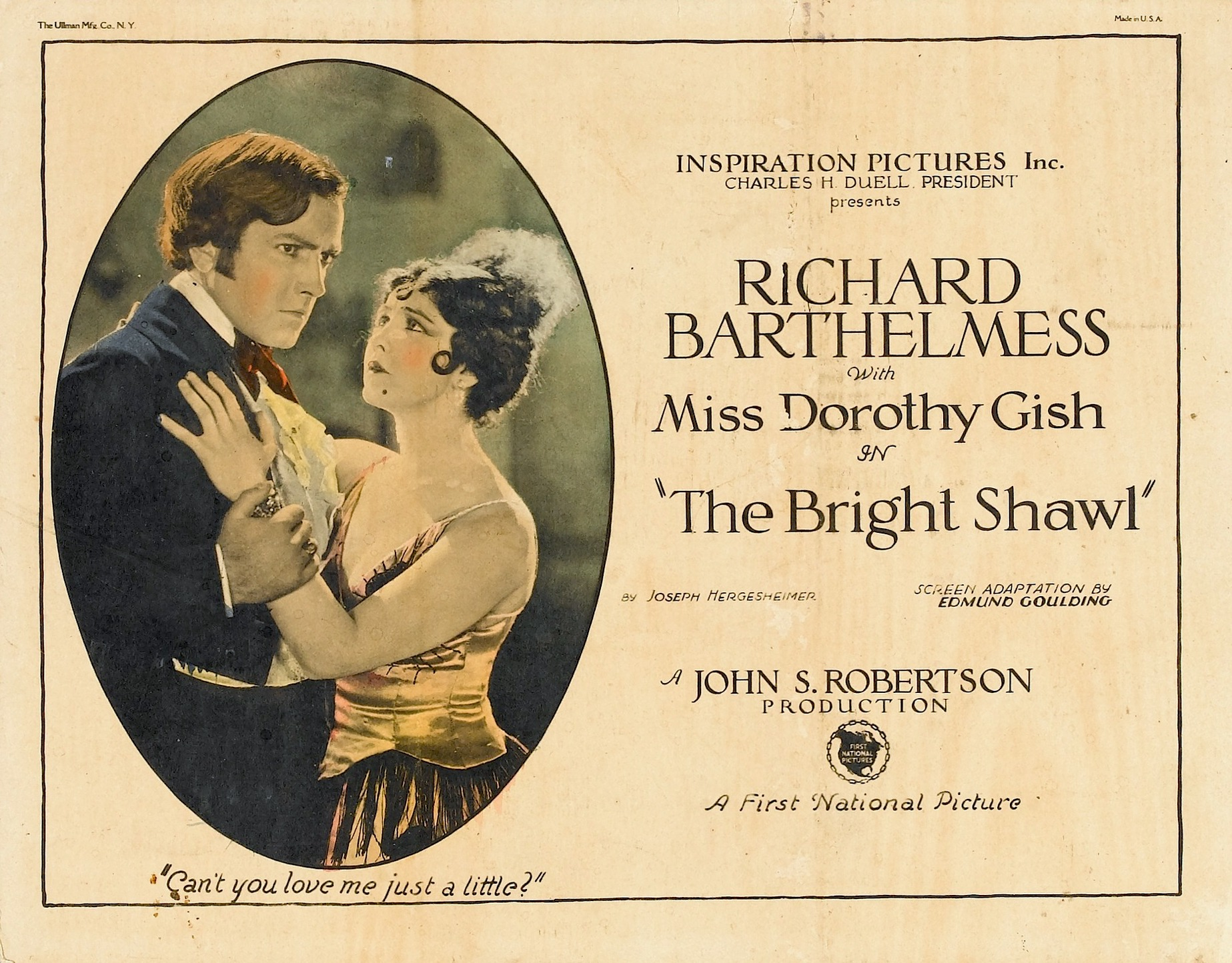
Lobby card for the film

The Bright Shawl is a 1923 American silent historical drama film directed by John S. Robertson and produced by and starring Richard Barthelmess. This film, based on a novel by Joseph Hergesheimer, had several days of filming on location in Cuba. It features the first confirmed film appearance of Edward G. Robinson (credited as E.G. Robinson).

== Plot ==
In the nineteenth century, an American visiting Cuba with a friend becomes mixed up with the island's independence movement against Spanish rule.

== Cast ==
- Richard Barthelmess as Charles Abbott
- Dorothy Gish as La Clavel
- Jetta Goudal as La Pilar
- William Powell as Gaspar De Vaca
- Mary Astor as Narcissa Escobar
- George Beranger as Andre Escobar (credited as Andre Beranger)
- Edward G. Robinson as Domingo Escobar (credited as E.G. Robinson)
- Margaret Seddon as Carmencita Escobar
- Anders Randolf as Captain Cesar Y Santacilla
- Luis Alberni as Vincente Escobar, Andre's brother
- George Humbert as Jaime Quintara
- Julian Rivero as a soldier (unbilled)

== Preservation ==
A print of The Bright Shawl survives at the UCLA Film & Television Archive.
