= Paris at Midnight =

1926 film by E. Mason Hopper

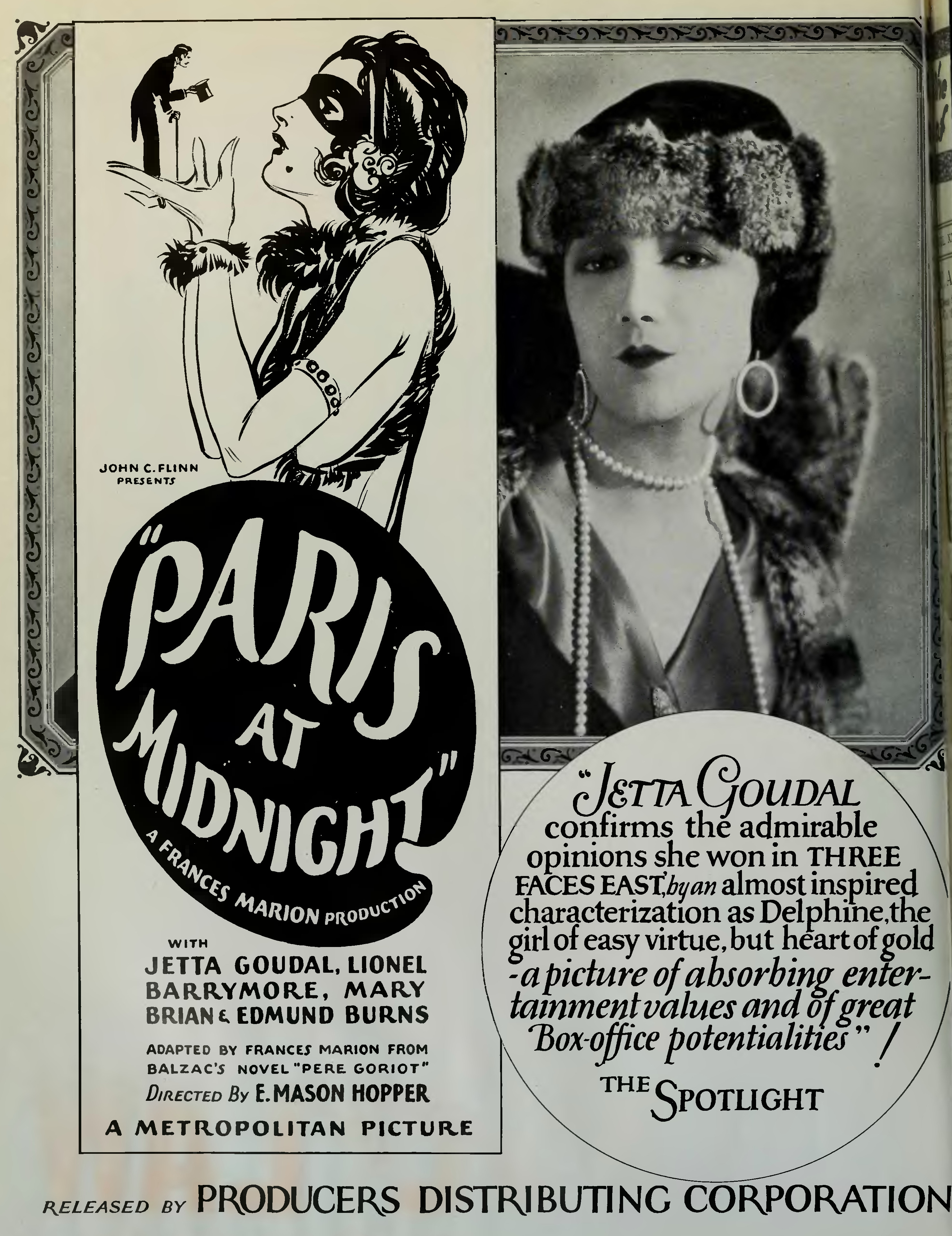
- Directed by: E. Mason Hopper; E. J. Babille (assistant)
- Written by: Frances Marion (adaptation)
- Based on: Le Père Goriot by Honoré de Balzac
- Produced by: Metropolitan Pictures Corporation of California
- Starring: Jetta Goudal; Lionel Barrymore
- Cinematography: Norbert Brodine
- Distributed by: Producers Distributing Corporation (PDC)
- Release date: April 18, 1926
- Running time: 70 minutes; 7 reels
- Country: United States
- Language: Silent (English intertitles)

Paris at Midnight is a 1926 American silent drama film starring Jetta Goudal and Lionel Barrymore and was directed by E. Mason Hopper. It was distributed by Producers Distributing Corporation. It was based on the novel Le Père Goriot by Honoré de Balzac.

== Plot ==
As described in a film magazine review, Eugene de Rastagnic, an impoverished artist loves Victorine Tallefer, an abandoned girl who stays at the same boarding house in Paris, but because of a lack of money turns away from her. They comfort Frederic Tallefer, an old man who also boards at the same place, and who gives all of his money to his two daughters who live in comfort. Eugene meets Delphine, one of the man's libertine daughters, and becomes infatuated with her. Vautrin, a man of mystery at the boarding house, makes the abandoned girl’s father, who hates her because her mother deserted him, take her back. Several interesting incidents occur because of the actions of Vautrin, who seems to find ways to resolve the problems of the boarding house residents. The artist Eugene finally realizes that he loves Victorine and they are reunited.

== Cast ==
- Jetta Goudal as Delphine
- Lionel Barrymore as Vautrin
- Mary Brian as Victorine Tallefer
- Edmund Burns as Eugene de Rastagnic
- Émile Chautard as Pere Goriot
- Brandon Hurst as Count Tarrefer
- Jocelyn Lee as Anastasie
- Mathilde Comont as Madame Vauquer
- Carrie Daumery as Madmoiselle Miche
- Fannie Yantis as Julie
- Jean De Briac as Frederic Tallefer
- Charles Requa as Maxime de Trailers
- Marion Morgan Dancers

== Preservation ==
A print of Paris at Midnight is preserved at the Cinémathèque Française, Paris.

== See also ==
- Lionel Barrymore filmography
