= Hungry Hearts (short story collection) =

1920 short story collection by Anzia Yezierska

- First edition
- Author: Anzia Yezierska
- Language: English
- Genre: short stories
- Publisher: Houghton Mifflin
- Publication date: 1920
- Publication place: United States
- Media type: Print
- ISBN: 0-14-118005-6

Hungry Hearts is a collection of short stories by Jewish/American writer Anzia Yezierska first published in 1920. The short stories deal with the European Jewish immigrant experience from the perspective of fictional female Jews, each story depicting a different aspect of their trials and tribulations in poverty in New York City at the turn of the 20th century. The stories were adapted into a film of the same name.

== Synopsis ==
- Wings

Shenah Peshah a young lonely janitress living a painfully secluded life in poverty. She is given hope when she meets a young sociologist who moves into her building to study the people he writes about and she falls in love with him.

- Hunger

A sequel to 'Wings', Peshah gets a job at a shirtwaist factory where one of the workers falls in love with her.

- The Lost "Beautifulness"

A mother dances on the edge of self-destruction when she paints her kitchen white for her son returning home from the military but has her rent raised by her cruel landlord as a response.

- The Free Vacation House

A woman being crushed by motherhood is offered a stay at a free vacation house but finds the strict humiliating living conditions worse than her life in poverty.

- The Miracle

A Jewish girl travels to America to find love but finds hardship and loneliness.

- Where Lovers Dream

Poverty separates a happy couple forever, marking their lives as lifestyles separate them.

- Soap and Water

A student is denied her diploma because of her unsightly appearance due to her grueling life going to school and supporting herself in grinding poverty, making her rebel against the divisions of class.

- "The Fat of the Land"

A mother goes from poverty to wealth, expecting happiness but only finding a cruel Catch-22.

- My Own People

A young writer finds inspiration and purpose in the suffering of her brethren.

- How I Found America
