= Bread Givers =

1925 novel by Anzia Yezierska

- First US edition (publ. Doubleday, Page)
- Author: Anzia Yezierska
- Language: English
- Publication date: 1925

Bread Givers is a 1925 novel by Jewish-American author Anzia Yezierska; the story of a young girl growing up in an immigrant Jewish household on the Lower East Side of Manhattan in New York City. Her parents are from Poland in the Russian Empire.

== Synopsis ==
"Bread Givers" a novel of a Jewish-American female coming-of-age story set in the 1920s written by Anzia Yezierska. 10-year-old Sara Smolinsky is the protagonist and narrator of Bread Givers. Sara lives in a tenement with her Orthodox Jewish father, Reb Smolinsky, her mother, Shenah, and her three older sisters Bessie, Fania, and Mashah on the Lower East Side. The Smolinskys are destitute; Sara's father devotes his time to the study of the Torah and Jewish sacred texts and refuses to help provide for the family's income. Sara's mother rents out the front room of their tenement to boarders after convincing her husband to move his sacred texts under her bed in order to have money to pay for rent.

The Smolinskys' struggle to pay their rent to the landlord, resulting in a confrontation between the landlord's rent collector and Reb Smolinsky. The rent collector demands the two months of past-due rent while Reb Smolinsky recites a hymn. Reb Smolinsky explains he does not have the money. In anger, the rent collector slams the Torah shut, causing the book to fall at her feet. Reb Smolinsky slaps her twice in anger, causing her to seek out the police to arrest him. Reb Smolinsky's short absence forces Sara to sell herring on Hester Street for income. When Reb Smolinsky returns home free of charges, the community on Hester Street admires him for hitting the rent collector.

Each of Sara's three older sisters falls in love and their father rejects each of their suitors. Reb Smolinsky decides to arrange marriages for each of his three older daughters despite them already being in love. He uses the arranged marriages for his own financial gain even though his daughters are unhappy. Sara witnesses the damage her father causes on her sisters by intervening in all of their relationships and makes a promise to herself to marry someone of her own choosing.

Reb Smolinsky's financial gain from Bessie's marriage causes him to quickly search for a business bargain. In the "Ghetto News" He reads an ad stating that a grocery store was for sale for $400 in Elizabeth, New Jersey. He decides to purchase the store without his wife's opinion, despite her pleading to go with him to make the deal. Once the transaction of the bargain is completed, Reb Smolinsky, his wife, and Sara discover that most of the stock in the store was fake and that they were swindled by the prior owner. Sara and her mother work in the store, but must confront with Reb Smolinsky's lack of business sense. He chases customers away from the store with his preaching and scolding. Eventually, Sara becomes frustrated with her father's stubbornness and she decides to move back to New York City alone, where she decides to become a teacher.

Sara creates a rigid daily schedule, causing her to ignore her family. She makes an effort to be a part of the social circles around her but is not accepted by her American peers. Rejected, she decides to focus on her studies. Coincidentally Max Goldstein, a business partner of Fania's husband, begins to pursue Sara. Sara enjoys her time with Max but realizes that they are not suited for one another because he does not understand Sara's need to complete her college education. Sara breaks up with Max and decides to focus solely on her studies.

Sara soon graduates from college with a teaching degree and with $1,000 that she won in an essay contest. Feeling successful, Sara returns home to find her mother fatally ill. After her mother's death, her father remarries, but learns that his new wife, the widow Mrs. Feinstein, is after his late wife's lodge money. Sara and her sisters become furious, viewing the quick marriage as a dishonor to their mother, and vow to not see their father. Sara begins teaching, but receives a letter from her father's new wife seeking financial help. Reb Smolinsky's daughters refuse to support him or his new wife.

Mrs. Feinstein, angered that Sara refuses to give her money, writes a letter to the principal of the school, Hugo Seelig, where Sara is teaching in an attempt to discredit her. Hugo sympathizes with Sara and they begin to date. During a dinner, Hugo and Sara find out they are countrymen: Jewish Polish American. Another night when Sara is on her way to have dinner with Hugo she finds her father extremely ill, lying in the gutter and selling chewing gum. Concerned, Sara walks her father home and begins to care for him by asking time off from teaching. Sara realizes that her father does need a wife to care for him and convinces her sisters to help support their father and his new wife. Reb Smolinsky later reveals to Sara that he is unhappy. Conflicted, Sara asks her father to come live with her and Hugo. Reb Smolinsky is concerned about whether he can live with Sara stating, promise to keep sacred all that is sacred to him. The novel ends with Sara and Hugo walking home agreeing to let Reb Smolinsky move in with them.

== Setting ==
The novel is set in the 1920s on Lower East Side of Manhattan specifically on Hester Street. The story takes place in three distinct settings: the tenements on Manhattan's Lower East Side in Hester St. where readers assume the Smolinsky family settled when they first arrived to America, the town of Elizabeth, New Jersey where her father Reb purchased the grocery store, and Sara's college (not named but outside the Jewish immigrant setting).

Sara describes the community in Hester St. as Jewish immigrants who settled with or near family and neighbors in the tenements of New York's Lower East Side, replicating their European communities. Thus, building a Jewish enclave within the Lower East Side of New York.

Sara depicts Elizabeth, New Jersey, differently as a more rural community based on an agricultural economy. The family is seen to interact with an American farmer or presumed Americanized immigrant laborers. Sara and her mother miss the close support of the community of women from the New York City tenements.

Sara becomes entirely lost in the forest of good Christ and after she left for college, Sara portrays her experience as unable to connect with students her age, only those older than her such as the principal of her school and staff.

== Charity in Bread Givers ==
Reb Smolinsky is portrayed as belonging to many different societies and charities. He is often accused of donating plenty of financial aid to an extent where it affects the families income. During the 1920s in news publications many ads were published encouraging Jewish immigrants with ties to their native home to donate and help Jewish workers in Europe receive a stable income. In the "Women's Wear Daily" an ad called Jews Donating Textile Shops to Kin Abroad encourages Jewish-American immigrants to donate money or textiles to support the cause of enabling home-town folk to earn a living all year round. The ad references different societies such as Proskurov, and the Society for the Promotion of Agricultural and Technical Trades Among the Jews and Eastern Europe.

== Reviews ==
In The New York Times Book Review September 13, 1925 article “Turbulent Folkways of the Ghetto in a New Novel”, critic from Doubleday, Page & Co. claims "Bread Givers" is a narrative about struggle in defeat and achievement within a community of Old World and New World standards. Bread Givers demonstrates the cultural differences within a Jewish-American household, traditional vs idealism.

In the "Chicago Daily Tribune" September 19, 1925 article "Bread Givers Paints Vivid Scene" by Fanny Butcher claims "Bread Givers" narrates the life of poverty in the struggle for success and education calling it a Cinderella story. Describing "Bread Givers" as emotionally impacting and revealing of a traditional strict father and a young assimilating daughter yearning for success.
