= Hungry Hearts (1922 film) =

1922 film by E. Mason Hopper

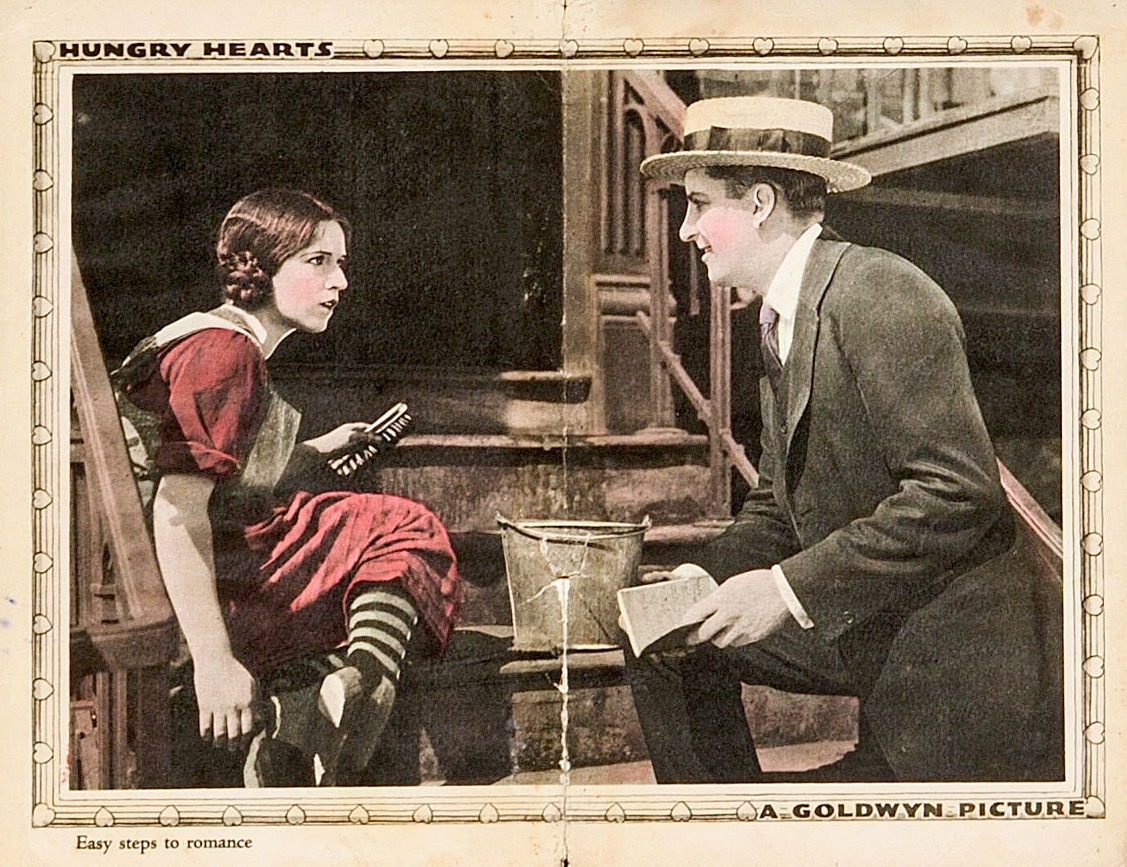
- Helen Ferguson and Bryant Washburn depicted in a lobby card for the film
- Directed by: E. Mason Hopper
- Written by: Montague Glass; Julien Josephson (titles); Anzia Yezierska (stories)
- Produced by: Samuel Goldwyn
- Starring: Helen Ferguson; E. Alyn Warren; Bryant Washburn
- Distributed by: Goldwyn Pictures
- Release date: November 26, 1922
- Country: United States
- Language: Silent (English intertitles)

Hungry Hearts (1922) is an American film based on stories by Anzia Yezierska about Jewish immigrants to the Lower East Side of New York City. The film was directed by E. Mason Hopper, produced by Samuel Goldwyn, and starred Helen Ferguson and E. Alyn Warren.

== Plot ==
As described in a film publication, the Levin family escapes from Europe and finds refuge in New York City, where everyone in the family must work. Sara finds janitor work and meets David, nephew of their landlord Rosenblatt. David falls in love with Sara and teaches her to read and write. He looks forward to when he can open a law office, be free of his uncle, and marry the girl. The uncle intervenes and parts the lovers, and then raises the rent of the Levin family without mercy. The stress causes Sara's mother to become temporarily insane and damage the walls of the apartment, and Rosenblatt takes them to court. Young lawyer David defends the family against his uncle, and the lovers are reunited while the family moves to the suburbs.

== Print survival ==
The film survives at BFI National Film Archives and the Academy Film Archive.

== Restoration ==
In October 2009, at the Spanish Synagogue in Prague, Berg Orchestra premiered Jan Dušek's incidental music for Hungry Hearts. In July 2010, the San Francisco Jewish Film Festival presented a restored print of the film, courtesy of the National Center for Jewish Film, the Samuel Goldwyn Company, and the British Film Institute..
