= Anzia Yezierska =

Jewish-American novelist (1880–1970)

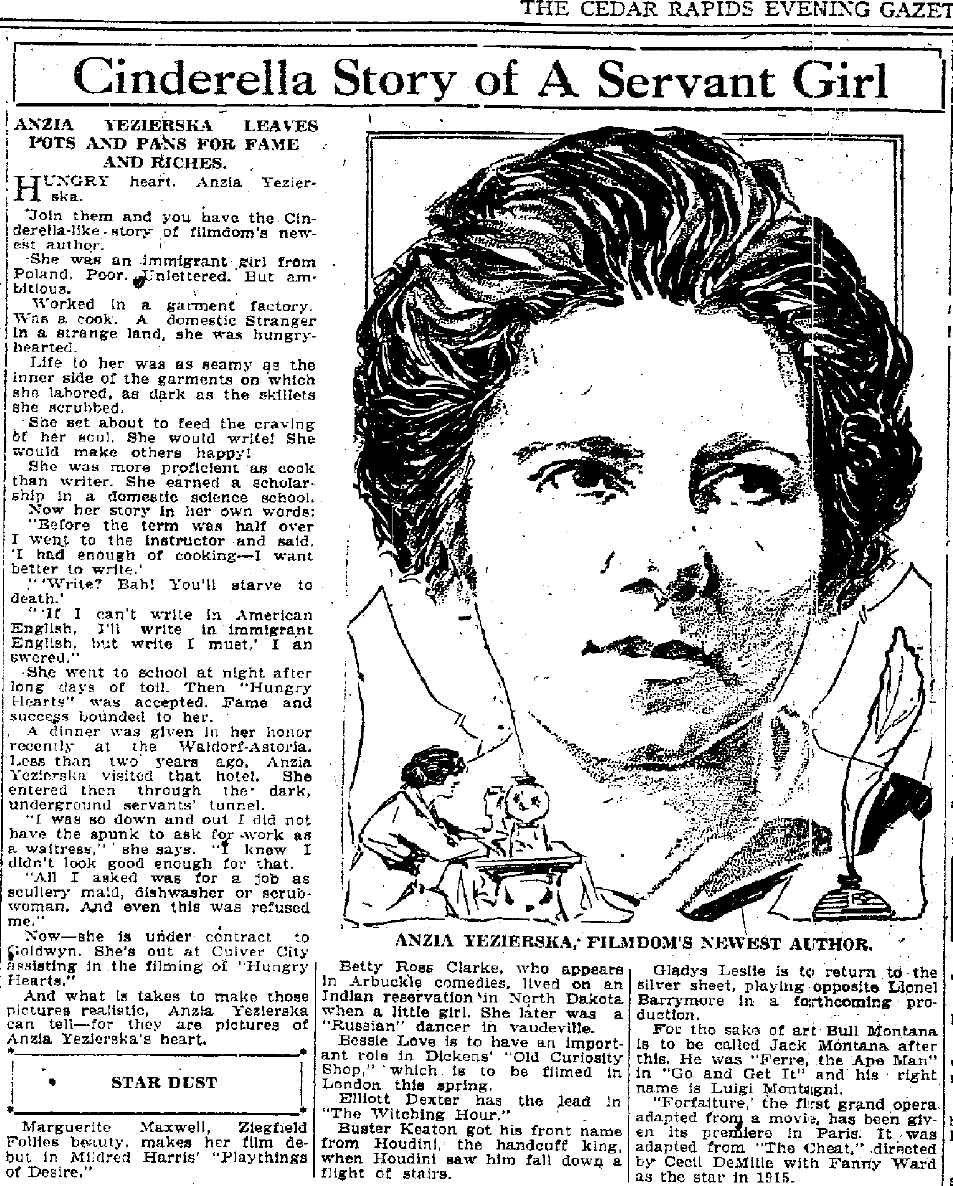
- Sketch of Anzia Yezierska 1921
- Born: October 29, 1880; Płock, Congress Poland, Russian Empire
- Died: November 20, 1970 (aged 90); Ontario, California, United States
- Occupations: Writer; novelist; essayist
- Writing career
- Genres: fiction; non-fiction

Anzia Yezierska (October 29, 1880 – November 20, 1970) was a Jewish-American novelist. She was born in Poland, which was then part of the Russian Empire, the youngest of nine children. She emigrated as a child with her parents to the United States and lived in Manhattan's Lower East Side ghetto. Her depictions of turn-of-the-century Jewish-American life—Hungry Hearts, Salome of the Tenements, and Bread Givers—won her acclaim in the 1920s, and she briefly worked as a screenwriter in Hollywood.

There are those who consider her the female equivalent of Abraham Cahan, editor of the Yiddish Jewish Daily Forward.

== Personal life ==
Yezierska was born in 1880 in the shtetl of Płock (Yiddish: Plotzk) in the Russian Pale of Settlement. Her parents were (Baruch) Bernard and Pearl. The Yezierski family emigrated to the United States in the early 1890s, looking for a better life, following in the footsteps of her eldest brother, who had arrived in the States a few years prior. They lived in a tenement on the Lower East Side.

The family was Jewish Orthodox and assumed the surname "Mayer" while Anzia took Harriet, or Hattie, as her first name (in her late twenties, she reclaimed her original name, Anzia Yezierska). Her father was a full time scholar of the Torah and Talmud and her mother worked to support the family. Her parents encouraged her brothers to pursue higher education, but believed Anzia and her sisters had to support their husbands and families. Anzia rebelled against the role she was thrust into, and left home in 1900.

She lived for a while at the Clara de Hirsch Home for Working Girls, where she studied domestic science. She won a scholarship in the domestic science program at Columbia Teachers College, which she attended until 1905. Following graduation, she taught home economics, first at the Lower East Side's Educational Alliance, and then in New York City public schools.

In early 1910, she fell in love with Arnold Levitas, but instead married his friend Jacob Gordon, a New York attorney, in November of that year. The marriage to Gordon was quickly annulled, and she then married Levitas in a religious ceremony to avoid legal complications. He was the father of her only child, Louise, born in May 1912.

Around 1914, Yezierska left Levitas and moved with her daughter to San Francisco, where she was employed as a social worker. Overwhelmed with the chores and responsibilities of working while raising a daughter, Yezierska gave up maternal rights and transferred custody to Levitas. In 1916, she and Levitas officially divorced.

She then moved back to New York City. Starting in 1917, she had a romantic relationship with philosopher John Dewey, a professor at Columbia University. Both Dewey and Yezierska wrote about one another, alluding to the relationship.

Yezierska was encouraged by her sister to pursue her longtime interest in becoming a professional writer. She devoted the remainder of her life to it.

Yezierska was the aunt of American film critic Cecelia Ager. Ager's daughter was journalist Shana Alexander.

Anzia Yezierska died November 21, 1970, of a stroke in a nursing home in Ontario, California.

== Writing career ==
Yezierska wrote about the struggles of Jewish and later Puerto Rican immigrants in New York City's ghettos particularly from the female perspective. She highlights the struggles against patriarchy, poverty, "old world" practices, Antisemitism, and especially the hardships endured by women coping with childcare and crowded conditions, while being financially dependent.

In her fifty-year writing career, she explored the cost of acculturation and assimilation among immigrants. Her stories provide insight into the meaning of liberation for immigrants—particularly Jewish immigrant women. Many of her works of fiction can be labeled semi-autobiographical, as she drew from her life growing up on the Lower East Side. Her works feature elements of realism with sharp attention to detail; she often has characters express themselves in Yiddish-English dialect. Her highly idealized characters, along with occasional passages of sentimentalism, have prompted some critics to classify her works as romantic.

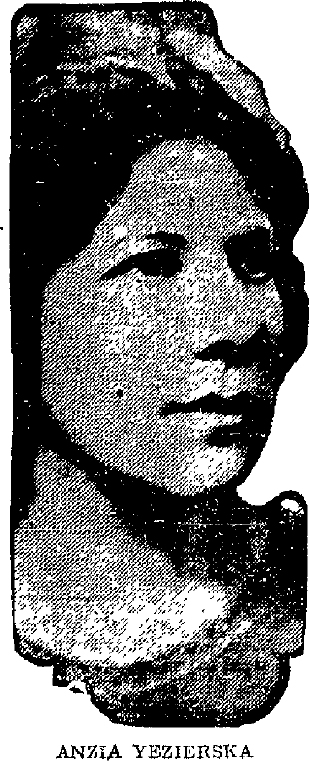
Anzia Yezierska in 1922

Yezierska turned to writing around 1912. Turmoil in her personal life prompted her to write stories about problems faced by wives. In the beginning, she had difficulty finding a publisher. But her persistence paid off in December 1915 when her story "The Free Vacation House" was published in The Forum. She attracted more critical praise the next year when her tale "Where Lovers Dream" appeared in Metropolitan magazine. In 1919 her literary endeavors received increased recognition when her rags-to-riches story "The Fat of the Land" won the Edward J. O'Brien award for Best Short Story of the Year and was published in the book Best Short Stories of 1919. Yezierska's early fiction was eventually collected by publisher Houghton Mifflin and released in a book titled Hungry Hearts (1920). Another collection of stories, Children of Loneliness, followed two years later. These stories focused on the children of immigrants and their pursuit of the American Dream.

Some literary critics argue that Yezierska's strength as an author can best be found in her novels. Her first, Salome of the Tenements (1923), was inspired by her friend Rose Pastor Stokes, as well as by Yezierska's romance with John Dewey. Rose Pastor had gained fame in 1905 as an impoverished young Jewish immigrant woman who, in what was characterized in newspapers as a Cinderella story, married a New York millionaire from a prominent Episcopalian family.

Yezierska's novel Bread Givers (1925) explores the life of a Jewish-American immigrant girl, Sara Smolinsky, who struggles to live from day to day while searching for her place in mainstream society. The novel has been reissued multiple times and remains Yezierska's most well-known work.

Arrogant Beggar chronicles the adventures of narrator Adele Lindner. The book exposes the hypocrisy of the charitably run "Hellman Home for Working Girls", where Lindner winds up after fleeing from Lower East Side poverty.

In 1929–1930, Yezierska received a Zona Gale fellowship at the University of Wisconsin, which gave her a financial stipend. She wrote several stories and finished a novel while serving as a fellow.

The end of the 1920s marked a decline of interest in Yezierska's work. During the Great Depression, she joined the Federal Writers' Project of the Works Progress Administration (WPA) and wrote the novel, All I Could Never Be. Published in 1932, it was inspired by her own struggles. As portrayed in the book, she identified as an immigrant and never felt truly American, believing native-born people had an easier time. It was the last novel she published before falling into obscurity.

Her fictionalized autobiography, Red Ribbon on a White Horse (1950), was published when she was nearly 70 years old. Her story "The Open Cage"—which she began in 1962 when her eyesight was failing—is one of her bleakest tales. It compares the life of an old woman to that of an ailing bird. Yezierska had stories, articles, and book reviews published until her death in California in 1970.

== Yezierska and Hollywood ==
The success of Yezierska's early short stories led to a brief, but significant, relationship between her and Hollywood. Movie producer Samuel Goldwyn bought the rights to her collection Hungry Hearts. The silent film of the same title (1922) was shot on location in New York's Lower East Side. It starred Helen Ferguson, E. Alyn Warren, and Bryant Washburn. Yezierska's 1923 novel Salome of the Tenements was adapted and produced as a silent film of the same title (1925).

Recognizing the popularity of Yezierska's stories, Goldwyn gave the author a $100,000 contract to write screenplays. In California, her success led her to being dubbed "the sweatshop Cinderella" by publicists. She was uncomfortable with being touted as a symbol of the American Dream. Frustrated by the shallowness of Hollywood and by her own alienation, she returned to New York in 1925.

== Revival of interest ==
Interest in Yezierska's work was rekindled in the 1970s and '80s with the growth of women's literature studies. The fact that she had left her husband and struck out on her own spoke to feminists. She also attracted scholars and readers who were drawn to the early 20th century American immigrant experience. In 1975, Persea Books reissued Bread Givers. The same publisher later reprinted All I Could Never Be, Red Ribbon on a White Horse, and Yezierska's collected stories.

== Works ==
- Hungry Hearts (short stories, 1920) OCLC 612854132
- Salome of the Tenements (novel, 1922) OCLC 847799604
- Children of Loneliness (short stories and autobiographical sketches, 1923) OCLC 9358120
- Bread Givers: a struggle between a father of the Old World and a daughter of the New (novel, 1925) OCLC 1675009
- Arrogant Beggar (novel, 1927) OCLC 1152530
- All I Could Never Be (novel, 1932) OCLC 7580900
- The Open Cage: An Anzia Yezierska Collection edited by Alice Kessler-Harris (New York: Persea Books, 1979) ISBN 978-0-89255-035-7.
- Red Ribbon on a White Horse: My Story (autobiographical novel, 1950) (ISBN 978-0-89255-124-8)
- How I Found America: Collected Stories (short stories, 1991) (ISBN 978-0-89255-160-6)

== Bibliography ==
- "Anzia Yezierska". In Dictionary of Literary Biography, Volume 221: American Women Prose Writers, 1870–1920. A Bruccoli Clark Layman Book. Edited by Sharon M. Harris, University of Nebraska, Lincoln. The Gale Group, 2000, p. 381–387.
- "Anzia Yezierska". In Dictionary of Literary Biography, Volume 28: Twentieth-Century American-Jewish Fiction Writers. A Bruccoli Clark Layman Book. Edited by Daniel Walden, Pennsylvania State University. The Gale Group, 1984, p. 332–335.
- Berch, Bettina. From Hester Street to Hollywood: The Life and Work of Anzia Yezierska. Sefer International, 2009.
- Bergland, Betty Ann. "Dissidentification and Dislocation: Anzia Yerzierska’s on a white horse". Reconstructing the 'Self' in America: Patterns in Immigrant Women's Autobiography. Ph.D. dissertation, University of Minnesota, 1990, 169244.
- Boydston, Jo Ann, ed. The Poems of John Dewey. Carbondale: Southern Illinois University Press, 1977.
- Cane, Aleta. "Anzia Yezierska". American Women Writers, 1900–1945: A Bio-Bibliographical Critical Source Book. Ed. Laurie Champion. Westport, Connecticut: Greenwood Press, 2000.
- Dearborn, Mary V. "Anzia Yezierska and the Making of an Ethnic American Self". In The Invention of Ethnicity. Ed. Werner Solors. New York: Oxford University Press, 1980, 105–123.
- --. Love in the Promised Land: The Story of Anzia Yezierska and John Dewey. New York: Free Press, 1988.
- --. Pocahontas's Daughters: Gender and Ethnicity in American Culture. New York Oxford University Press, 1986.
- Goldsmith, Meredith. "Dressing, Passing, and Americanizing: Anzia Yezierska's Sartorial Fictions". Studies in American Jewish Literature 16 (1997): 34–45.
- Henriksen, Louise Levitas. Anzia Yezierska: A Writer's Life. New Brunswick, N.J: Rutgers University Press, 1988.
- Henriksen, Louise Levitas. "Afterword about Anzia Yezierska". In The Open Cage: An Anzia Yezierska Collection. New York: Persea Books, 1979, 253–62.
- Inglehart, Babbette. "Daughters of Loneliness: Anzia Yezierska and the Immigrant Woman Writer". Studies in American Jewish Literature, 1 (Winter 1975): 1–10.
- Japtok, Martin. "Justifying Individualism: Anzia Yezierska's Bread Givers". The Immigrant Experience in North American Literature: Carving out a Niche. Eds. Katherine B. Payant and Toby Rose. Contributions to the Study of American Literature. Westport, CT: Greenwood, 1999. 17–30.
- Kessler-Harris, Alice. "Introduction". In The Open Cage: An Anzia Yezierska Collection. New York: Persea Books, 1979, v-xiii.
- Konzett, Delia Caparoso. "Administered Identities and Linguistic Assimilation: The Politics of Immigrant English in Anzia Yezierska's Hungry Hearts". American Literature 69 (1997): 595–619.
- Levin, Tobe. "Anzia Yezierska". Jewish American Women Writers: A Bio-Bibliographical Critical Source Book. Ed. Ann Shapiro. Westport, Connecticut: Greenwood Press, 1994.
- Luzon, Danny. "The Manifold Self in Anzia Yezierska's Fiction: Tensions Between Individual and Communal Identities in Salome of the Tenements and Bread Givers." M.A. Thesis, Tel Aviv University, 2012.
- Piehslinger, Valerie-Kristin. Portrayals of Urban Jewish Communities in U.S. American and Canadian Immigrant Fiction in Selected Texts by Anzia Yezierska and Adele Wiseman. Saarbrücken: AV Akademikerverlag, 2013.
- Schoen, Carol B. Anzia Yezierska. Boston: Twayne, 1982.
- Stinson, Peggy. Anzia Yezierska. Ed. Lina Mainiero. Vol. 4. New York: Frederick Ungar Publishing Co., 1982.
- Stubbs, Katherine. "Reading Material: Contextualizing Clothing in the Work of Anzia Yezierska". MELUS, 23.2 (1998): 157–72.
- Wexler, Laura. "Looking at Yezierska". In Women of the World: Jewish Women and Jewish Writing. Ed. Judith R. Baskin. Detroit: Wayne State University Press, 1994, 153–181.
- Wilentz, Gay. "Cultural Mediation and the Immigrant's Daughter: Anzia Yezierska's Bread Givers". MELSUS, 17, NO. 3(1991–1992): 33–41.
- Zaborowska, Magdalena J. "Beyond the Happy Endings: Anzia Yezierska Rewrites the New World Woman". In How we Found America: Reading Gender through East European Immigrant Narratives. Chapel Hill: University of North Carolina Press, 1995, 113–164.
