= Helen Ferguson =

American actress (1901–1977)

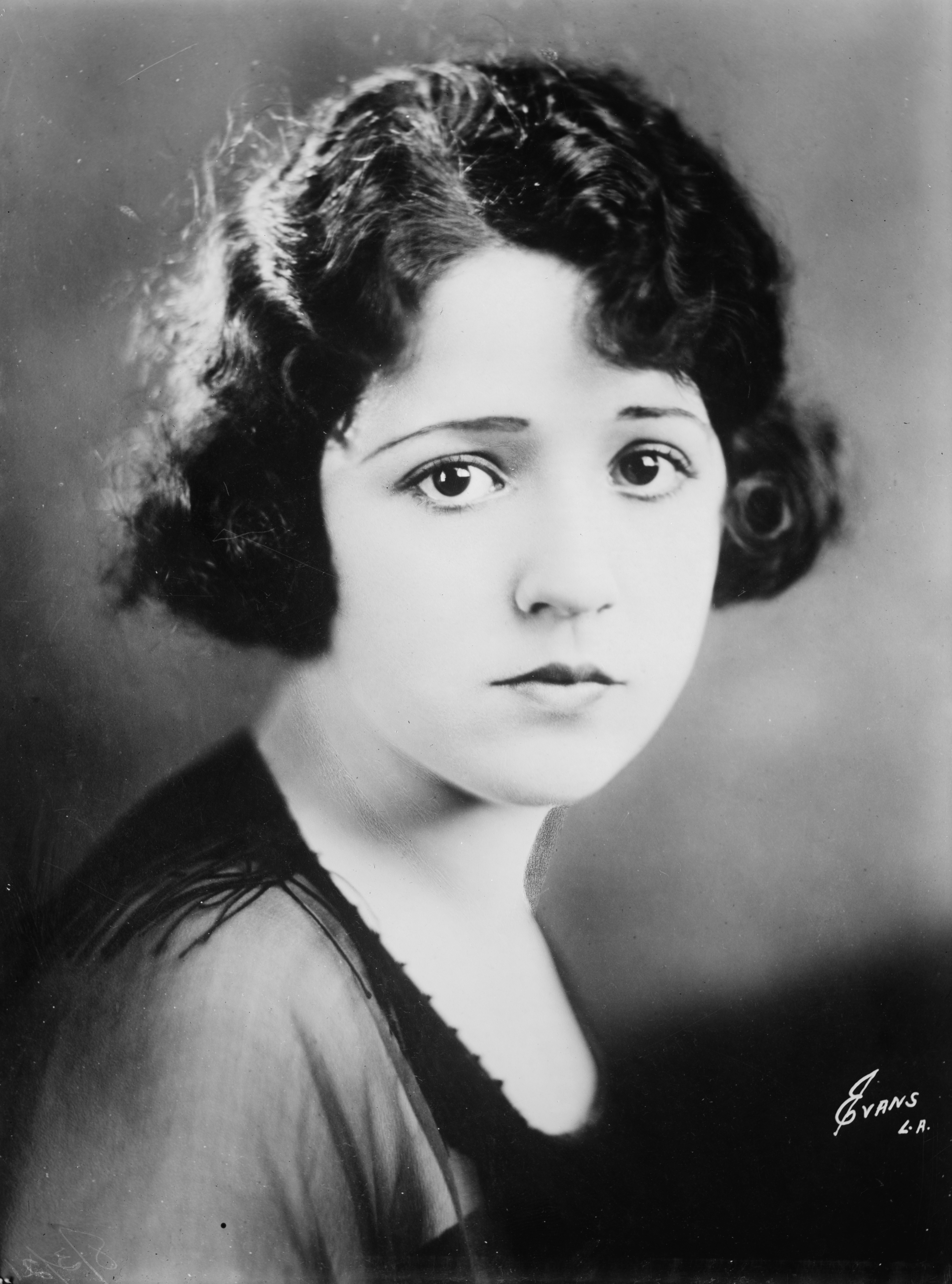
- Born: July 23, 1901; Decatur, Illinois, U.S.
- Died: March 14, 1977 (aged 75); Clearwater, Florida, U.S.
- Occupations: Actress, publicist
- Spouses: William Russell (m. 1925; died 1929) Richard L. Hargreaves (m. 1930; died 1941)

Helen Ferguson (July 23, 1901 – March 14, 1977) was an American actress later turned publicist.

== Biography ==
Born in Decatur, Illinois in 1901, Ferguson graduated from Nicholas High School of Chicago and the Academy of Fine Arts. Ferguson was a newspaper reporter before entering the motion picture field.

Ferguson began working in films as a stunt girl when she was 12 years old, although her first recorded credits are in 1917. She soon starred in roles for Fox Film Corporation by 1920, which is when her career really took off with films such as Hungry Hearts (1922) for Samuel Goldwyn. She was cast mostly in westerns, comedies, and serials. She was selected as one of the WAMPAS Baby Stars in 1922.

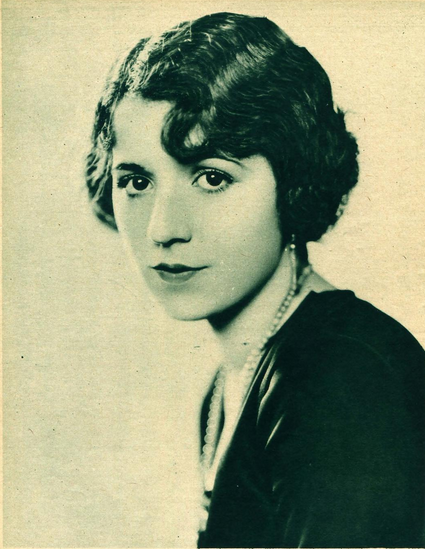
Helen Ferguson (1923)

On June 21, 1925, Ferguson married actor William Russell, who died in 1929. The following year, she married businessman Richard L. Hargreaves. Following her second marriage, she left films to concentrate on stage work, though she only received minimal success in this medium.

In 1933, she left acting altogether to become a publicity and public relations counselor, a job that made her a major power in Hollywood, because she was representing such big name stars as Henry Fonda, Barbara Stanwyck, and Robert Taylor, among others. Ferguson represented actress Loretta Young for more than nineteen years. She kept reporters from needlessly disturbing Young and was considered one of the foremost "suppress agents" in Hollywood.

The front of her publicity office was photographed by Ansel Adams for the March 1941 edition of Fortune magazine and shown in the March 17, 2008, episode of California's Gold.

In 1941, her second husband died and she retired from publicity work in 1967.

== Death ==
Ferguson died in Clearwater, Florida in 1977, aged 75. She is buried at Forest Lawn Glendale in Glendale, California.

== Recognition ==
Ferguson has a star on the Hollywood Walk of Fame for her contributions to Motion Pictures at 6153 Hollywood Blvd.

== Partial filmography ==
- Max Wants a Divorce (1917)
- The Small Town Guy (1917)
- Filling His Own Shoes (1917)
- Gift O' Gab (1917)
- Life's Greatest Problem (1918)
- The End of the Road (1919)
- The Great Victory (1919)
- Burning Daylight (1920)
- Going Some (1920)
- The Romance Promoters (1920)
- The Mutiny of the Elsinore (1920)
- Just Pals (1920)
- The Right Way (1921)
- The Freeze-Out (1921)
- Miss Lulu Bett (1921)
- Desert Blossoms (1921)
- The Call of the North (1921)
- Hungry Hearts (1922)
- Roughshod (1922)
- According to Hoyle (1922)
- The Famous Mrs. Fair (1923)
- Brass (1923)
- Within the Law (1923)
- Double Dealing (1923)
- The Unknown Purple (1923)
- Chalk Marks (1924)
- Never Say Die (1924)
- Racing Luck (1924)
- The Right of the Strongest (1924)
- The Valley of Hate (1924)
- Why Get Married? (1924)
- The Cloud Rider (1925)
- The Scarlet West (1925)
- Spook Ranch (1925)
- Wild West (1925)
- Nine and Three-Fifths Seconds (1925)
- Casey of the Coast Guard (1926)
- The Fire Fighters (1927)
- Taxi! Taxi! (1927)
- Jaws of Steel (1927)
- In Old California (1929)
- Scarlet Pages (1930)
