= New York County Courthouse =

Courthouse in Manhattan, New York

New York State Supreme Court Building
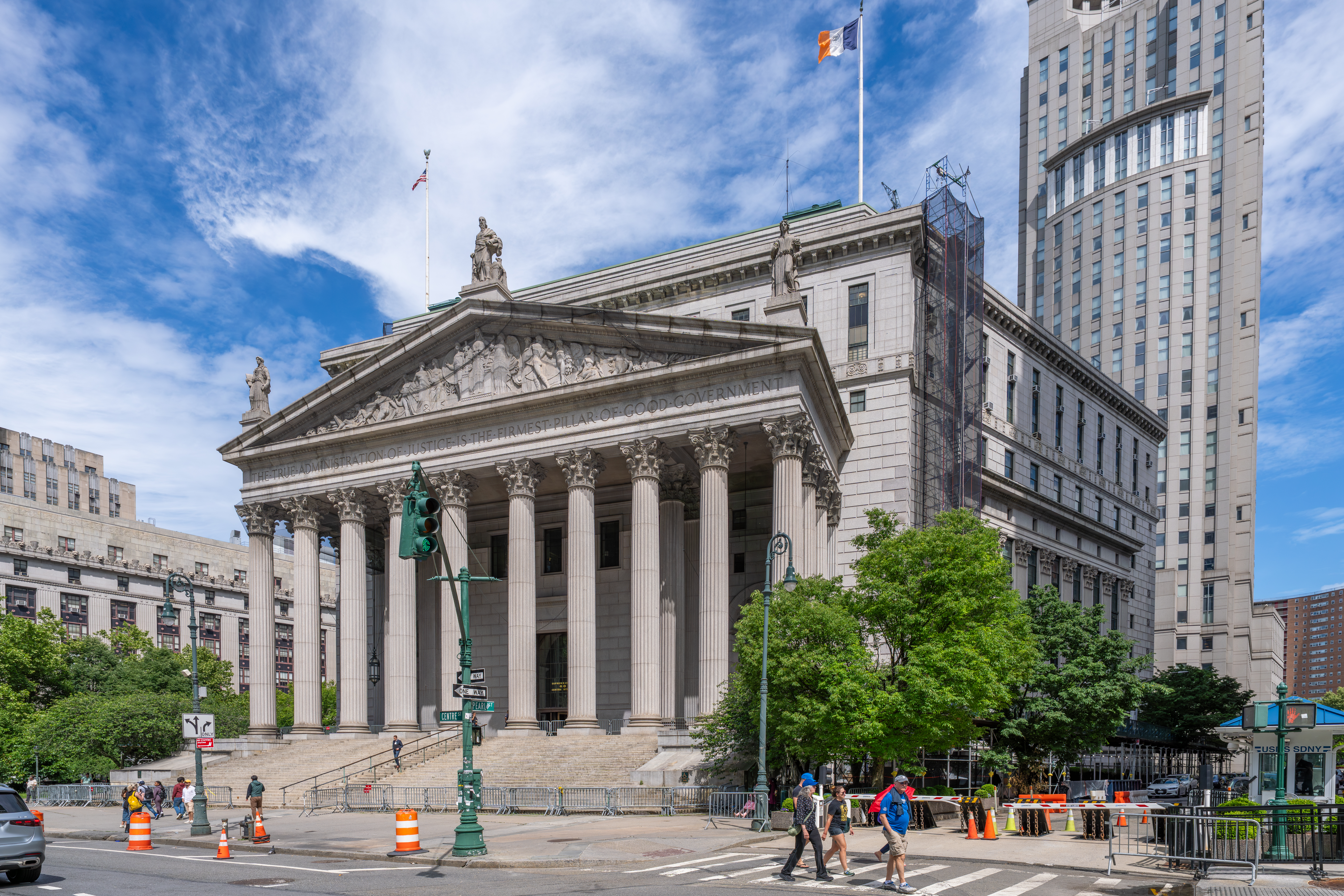
- New York State Supreme Court Building (2026)
- Interactive map of the New York State Supreme Court Building area
- Former names: New York County Courthouse

General information
- Location: 60 Centre Street; New York, NY, United States
- Coordinates: 40°42′51.2″N 74°0′5.5″W
- Current tenants: New York State Supreme Court; New York County Clerk
- Groundbreaking: 1919
- Opened: February 1927
- Owner: City of New York

Design and construction
- Architect: Guy Lowell

New York City Landmark
- Designated: February 1, 1966 (exterior); March 24, 1981 (interior)
- Reference no.: 0083 (exterior); 1124 (interior)

The New York State Supreme Court Building (also known as the New York County Courthouse) is located at 60 Centre Street on Foley Square in the Civic Center neighborhood of Manhattan in New York City. It houses the Civil and Appellate Terms of the New York State Supreme Court for the state's First Judicial District, which is coextensive with Manhattan, as well as the offices of the New York County Clerk.

The granite-faced hexagonal building was designed by Guy Lowell of Boston in classical Roman style and was built between 1913 and 1927, completion having been delayed by World War I. It replaced the former New York County Courthouse on Chambers Street, popularly known as the Tweed Courthouse. Both the interior and exterior are New York City Landmarks: the exterior was designated on February 1, 1966 and the interior on March 24, 1981.

== Site ==
South of the building is Cass Gilbert's 1936 Corinthian-columned Thurgood Marshall United States Courthouse, which also faces Foley Square from the east. Both buildings face Federal Plaza across the square, which includes the more modern Jacob K. Javits Federal Building and James L. Watson Court of International Trade Building, which houses the U.S. Court of International Trade. Other court buildings are nearby, including those for New York City Criminal Court, New York City Civil Court, and the Surrogate's Courthouse.

== Architecture ==
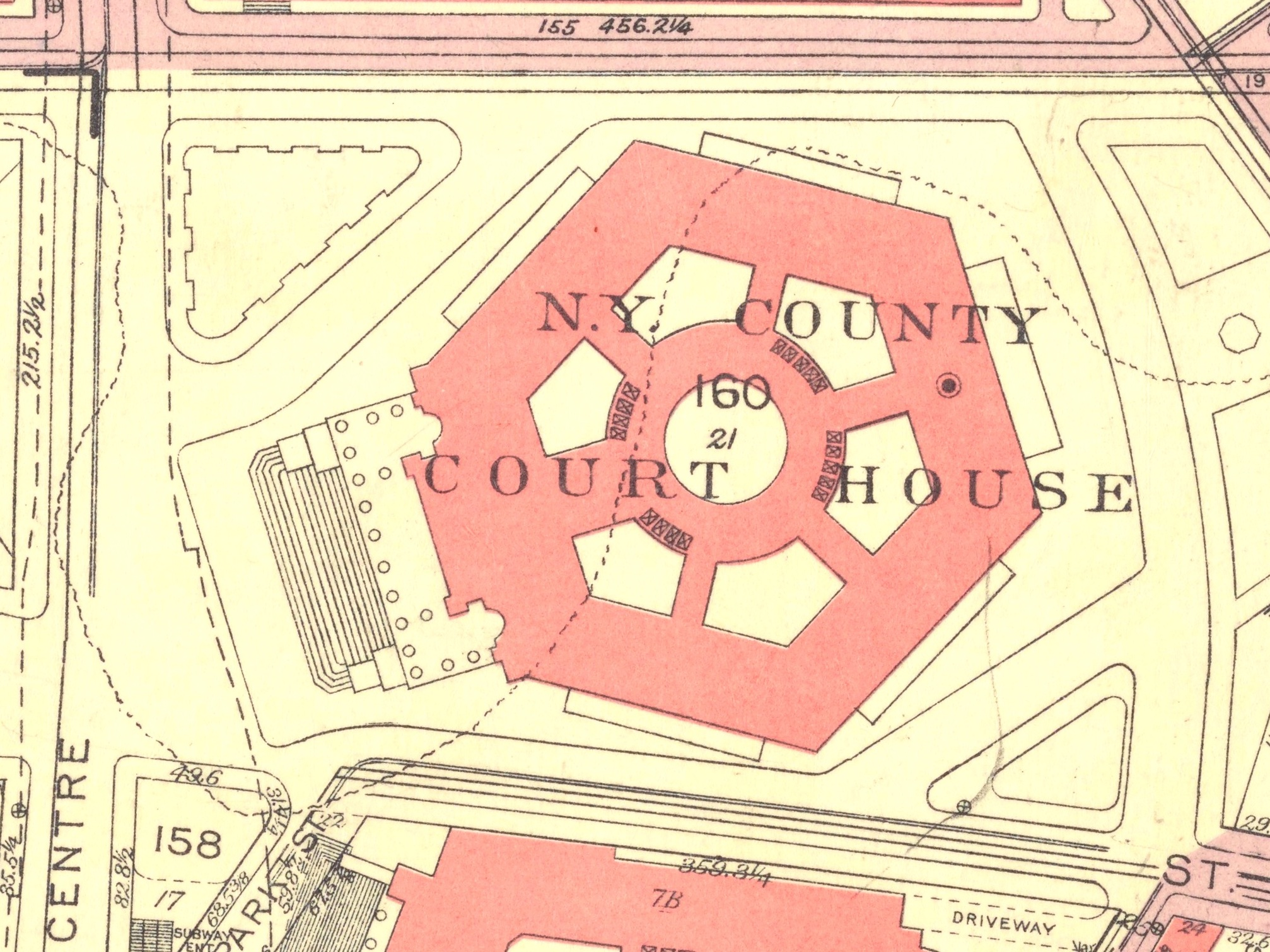
New York County Courthouse Map, 1955–56

=== Exterior ===
The building's mass and scale give it the appearance of a temple. A broad set of steps sweeps up from Foley Square to a massive Corinthian colonnade covering most of the front of the courthouse, topped by an elaborate 140-foot-long (43 m) triangular pediment of thirteen figures carved in bas relief from granite. The pediment and acroteria by Frederick Warren Allen include three statues: Law, Truth, and Equity. A frieze bears the inscription "The true administration of justice is the firmest pillar of good government", a quotation taken from a letter written by George Washington to Attorney General Edmund Randolph on September 28, 1789. The inscription is a slight misquote; Washington actually referred to the "due administration" of justice and not the "true administration" of justice, an error discovered by the New York Post in 2009. The error was apparently made by the architect, Guy Lowell, and the mistake was repeated by others, including Charles Warren in his Pulitzer Prize–winning The Supreme Court in United States History (1922).

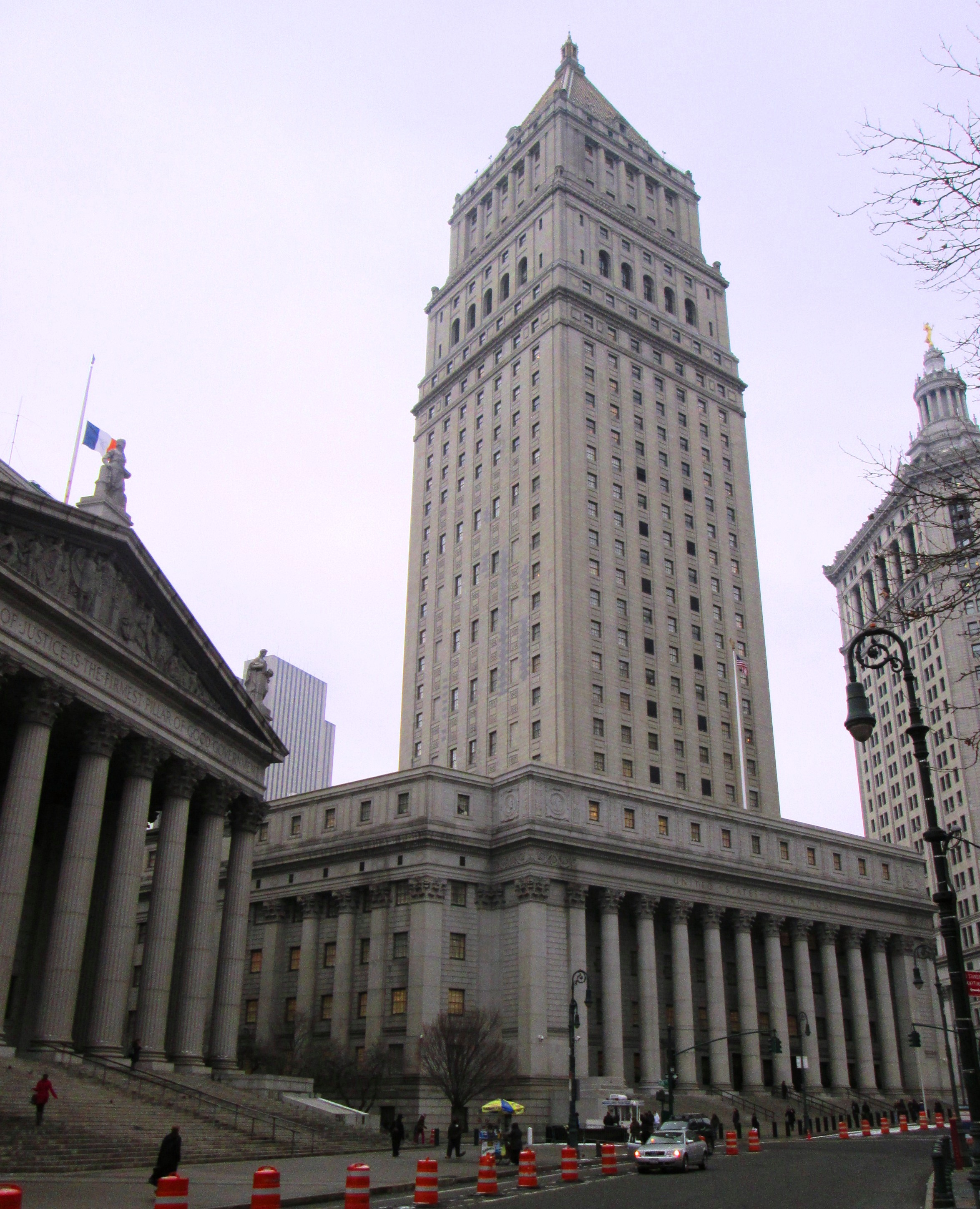
Along Foley Square, the Thurgood Marshall United States Courthouse (right) sits next to the New York State Supreme Court Building (left). On the far right can be seen part of the Manhattan Municipal Building.

The stone steps leading up to the colonnaded entrance were flanked by two allegorical statues, Justice and Authority, both designed by the Franco-American sculptor Philip Martiny (1858–1927). These are now at the back of the building. Both are large seated figures made of granite. On the right is Justice, a female figure holding a shield and scroll, while on the left is Authority, which holds a scroll and fasces, the Roman symbol of authority. The figures were purchased by the government of New York City in 1906 and originally flanked the Centre Street entrance to the Surrogate's Courthouse; they were removed in early 1960 for the widening of Centre Street and an expansion of the underlying platforms of the New York City Subway's Brooklyn Bridge–City Hall station and were then moved to the New York County Courthouse.

=== Interior ===
The rotunda is 200 feet (61 m) in circumference and rises 75 feet (23 m) to a cupola which is 30 feet (9.1 m) high and 20 feet (6.1 m) long. The rotunda also contains ten stained-glass windows and clerestory. The rotunda's most striking feature, however, is the oft-reproduced circular mural Law Through the Ages, also called The History of the Law. This New Deal–era mural was designed by the Italian artist Attilio Pusterla and painted by him and a team of artists working under his direction from 1934 and 1936, under sponsorship from the Federal Art Project of the Works Project Administration. Pusterla also executed murals in the courthouse's Jury Assembly Rooms on the fourth floor and Ceremonial Courtroom on the third floor.

Law Through the Ages is divided into six lunettes, or sections. Each depicts a pair of figures from historical cultures important to the history of law: Assyrian and Egyptian, Hebraic and Persian, Greek and Roman, Byzantine and Frankish, English and early colonial, with the final section portraying George Washington and Abraham Lincoln. Above the seated figures are portraits of six lawgivers: Hammurabi, Moses, Solon, Justinian, Blackstone and John Marshall.

Restoration of the mural (along with a stained-glass window also by Pusterla) took place in 1988; the project received a 1989 Design Award from the Public Design Commission of the City of New York. The restoration project, which was privately funded by money raised from New York City judges and attorneys, was part of a broader renovation campaign in the 1980s and 1990s to protect the courthouse's historic art from water seepage and other damage caused by neglect.

== History ==
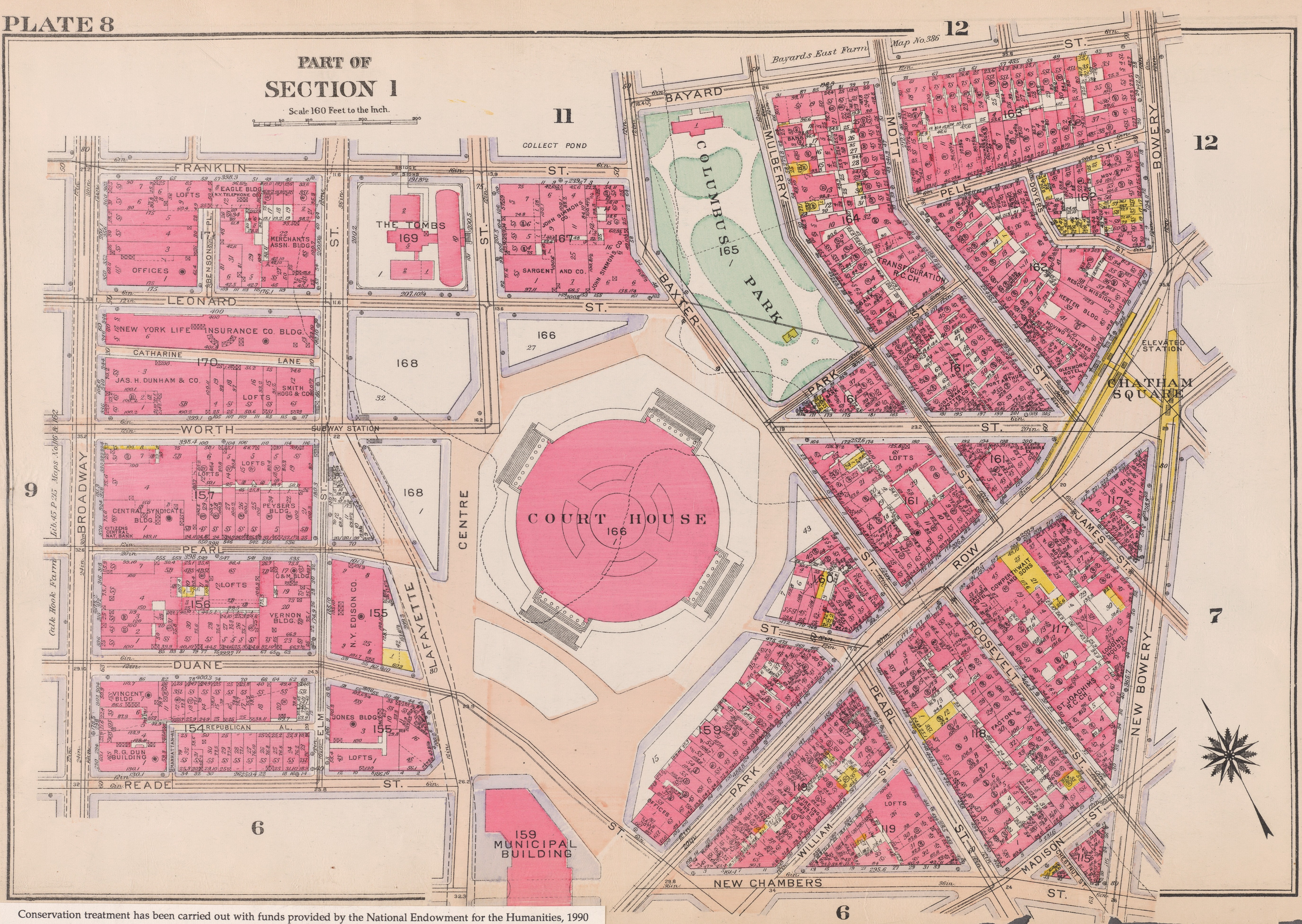
Lowell's prize-winning 1913 design, never built, had a circular plan and would have altered Worth Street.

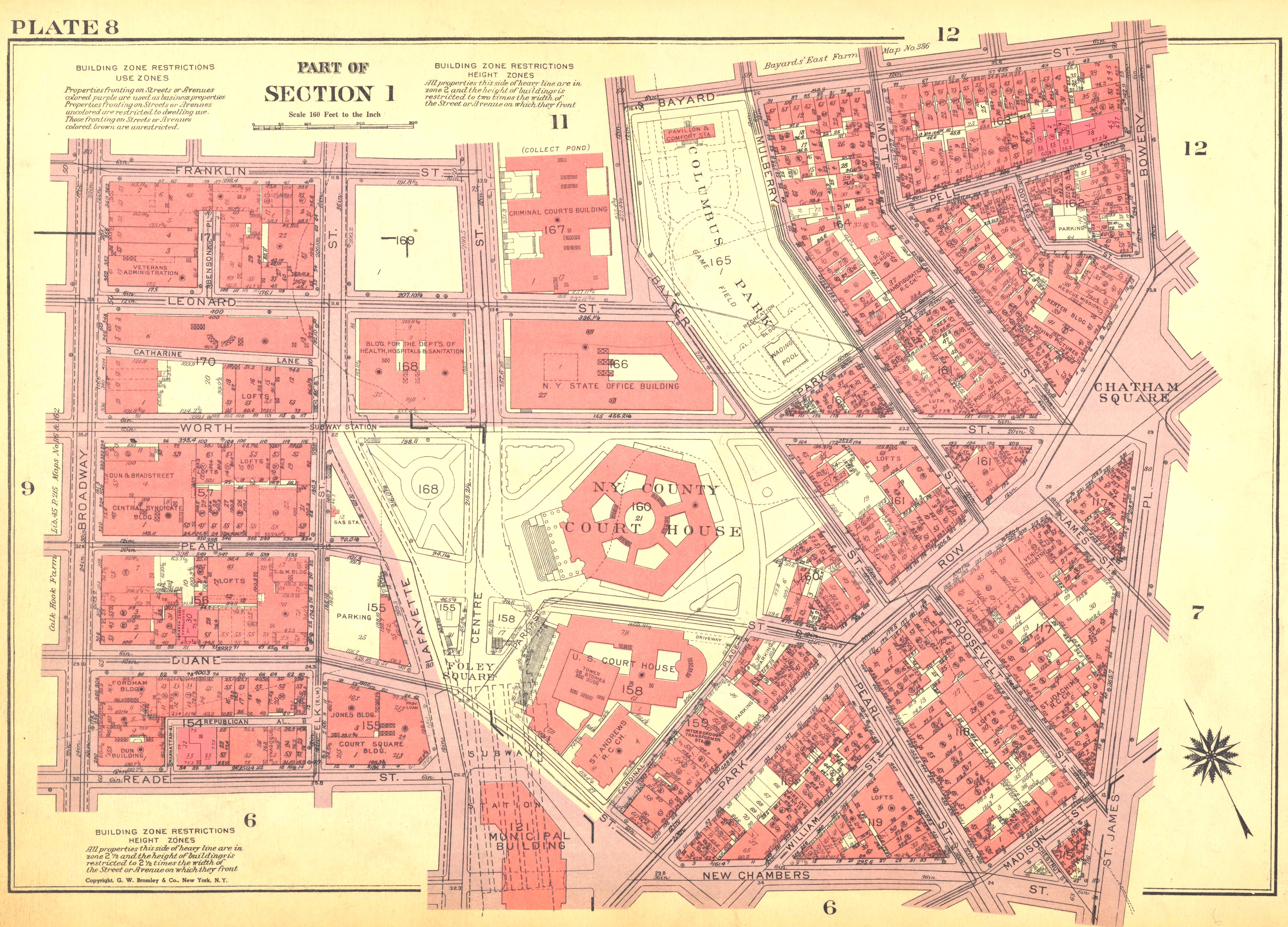
As built, the courthouse is smaller and has a hexagonal plan.

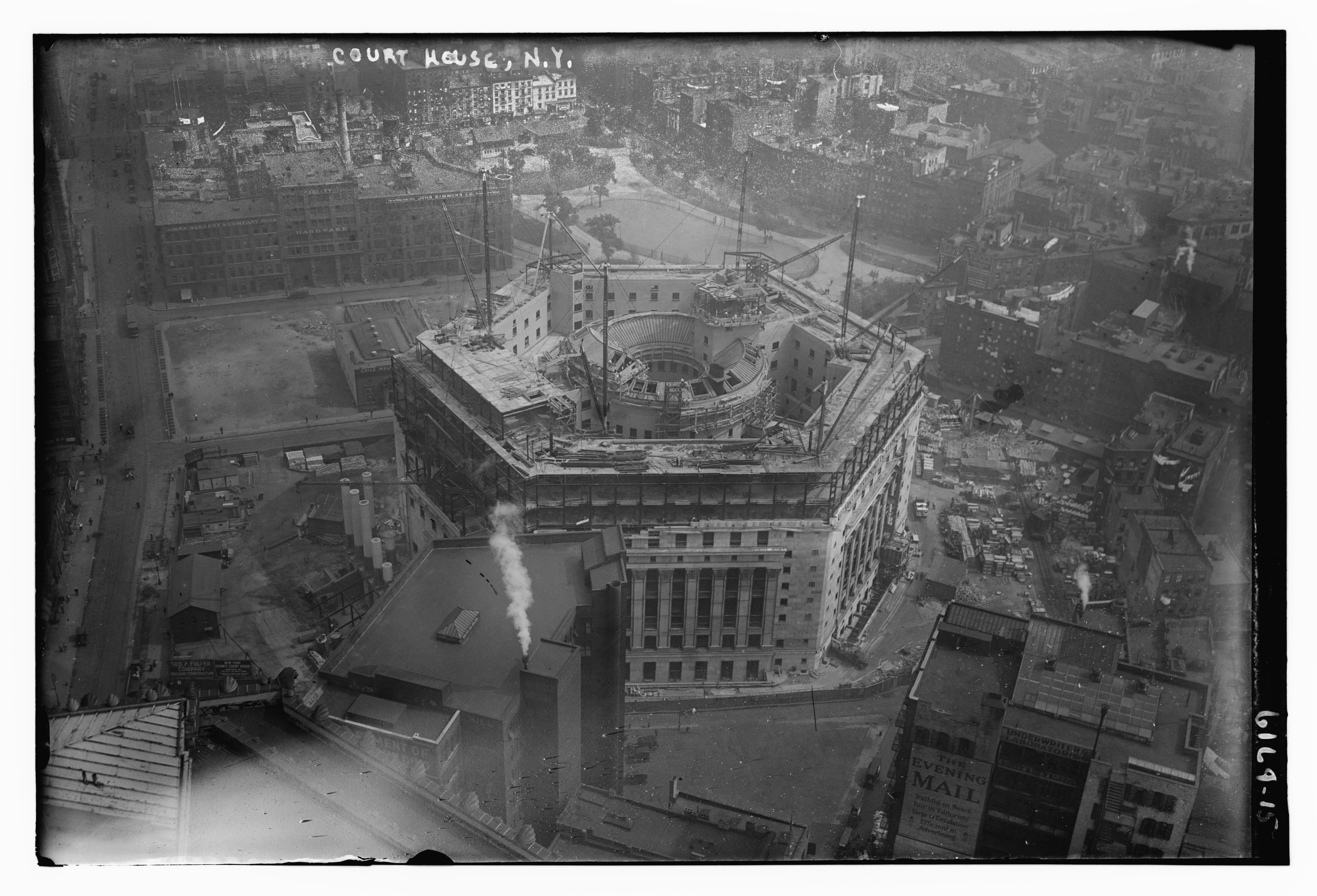
Under construction in 1924

The architect was selected through a design competition, which Boston architect Guy Lowell won in 1913. Lowell originally proposed a circular building, to be built at the vastly expensive sum of $20 to $30 million. Construction was delayed by World War I and the design was remade as a smaller and less expensive hexagonal building—a Temple of Justice. The building was designed in the Roman classical style. Work began in 1919.

The courthouse's dedication ceremony took place in February 1927, two weeks after Lowell died. Chief Judge of the New York Court of Appeals Benjamin Cardozo and Associate Judges of the Court of Appeals Frederick E. Crane and Irving Lehman were present at the event.

== In popular culture ==
Many films and television series have been shot at the New York County Courthouse. These include:

- Miracle on 34th Street (1947): the scene of the trial of Santa Claus (Edmund Gwenn) was shot here; the 1994 remake filmed the courthouse's exterior
- 12 Angry Men (1957)
- The Defenders (1961-1965)
- The Godfather (1972)
- Nuts (1987)
- Legal Eagles (1986)
- Wall Street (1987)
- Goodfellas (1990)
- Teenage Mutant Ninja Turtles (1990)
- Regarding Henry (1991)
- Joker: Folie à Deux (2024)
- Petrocelli, television series, during opening credits
- Night Court, television series
- Law & Order and its many spinoffs
- Kojak
- Cagney & Lacey
- Damages
- Blue Bloods
- Bull, television series, end scene in season 2 episode 22
- Suits, television series

In addition, in 2022, a recreation of the court building was completed in the sandbox game Minecraft by a team of over 2,000 players as part of their efforts to recreate New York City during the Build the Earth movement.

== See also ==
- List of New York City Designated Landmarks in Manhattan below 14th Street
- Appellate Division Courthouse of New York State
