= Chambers Street (Manhattan) =

Street in Manhattan, New York

Coordinates: 40°42′55″N 74°00′31″W

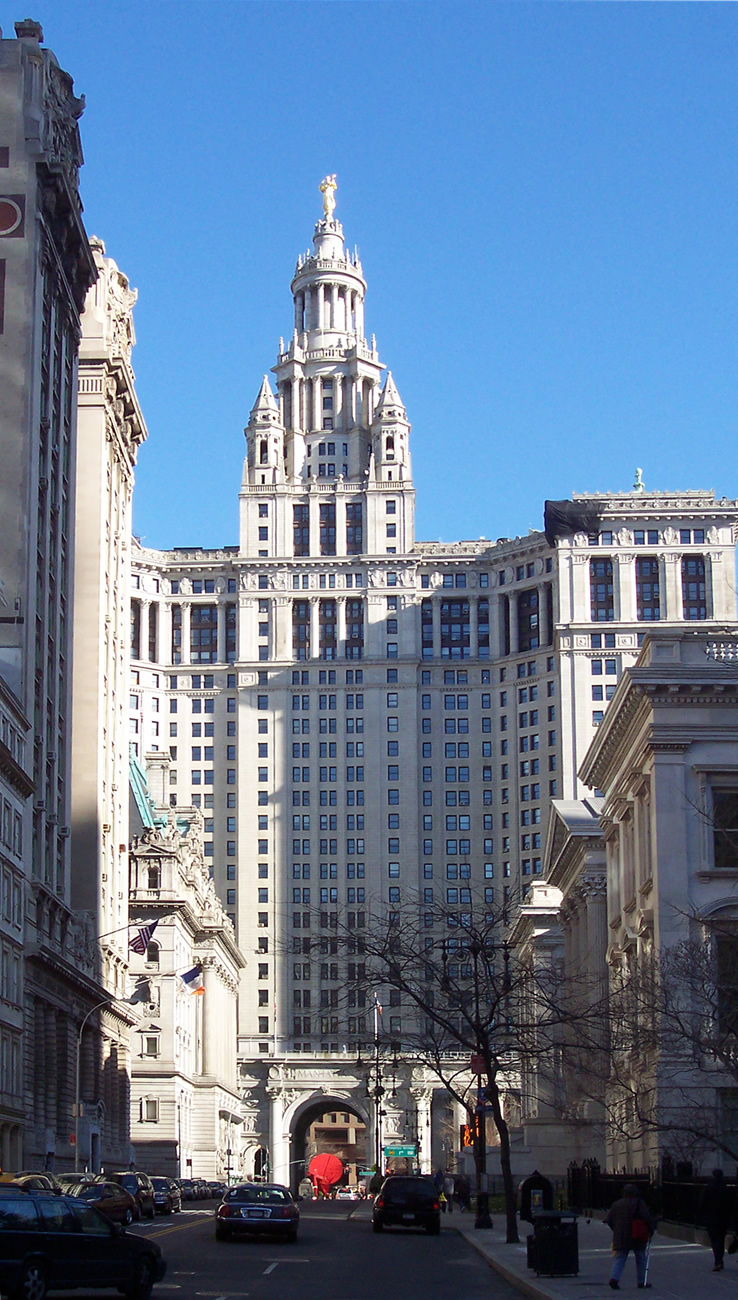
View eastward along Chambers Street toward the Manhattan Municipal Building

Chambers Street is a two-way street in the New York City borough of Manhattan. It runs from River Terrace, Battery Park City in the west, past PS 234 (the Independence School), Borough of Manhattan Community College, and Stuyvesant High School, to the Manhattan Municipal Building at 1 Centre Street in the east. Between Broadway and Centre Street, Chambers Street forms the northern boundary of the grounds surrounding New York City Hall and the Tweed Courthouse. Opposite the Tweed Courthouse sits the Surrogate's Courthouse for Manhattan. 280 Broadway the Marble Palace, lies west of there, on the north side of Chambers.

== History ==
Chambers Street is named for attorney John Chambers (1710–1764), an important parishioner at Trinity Church in Manhattan, where he was vestryman (1726–1757) and warden (1757–1765) of the church for 38 years, son of William Chambers, and husband of Anna Van Cortlandt. Chambers's nephew was John Jay. John Murray, Chambers' law partner, has nearby Murray Street named after him.

Before 1971, Chambers Street continued east of Centre Street as a street called New Chambers Street, which ran through the Municipal Building's archway. In its final configuration, New Chambers Street carried traffic westbound from the intersection of Park Row, the Brooklyn Bridge off-ramp, and Duane Street. In 1971, the street was closed to make way for the construction of the pedestrian plaza at 1 Police Plaza. Duane Street was also closed and the intersection with Park Row was eliminated, with Park Row rerouted underneath the pedestrian plaza.

Beginning in 2010, Chambers Street was fully reconstructed. The rebuilding was finished in 2015.

== Transportation ==
The New York City Subway has three stations on Chambers Street:

- Chambers Street–World Trade Center (IND Eighth Avenue Line), at Church Street serving the A, C, and E trains
- Chambers Street (BMT Nassau Street Line), at Centre Street serving the J and Z trains
- Chambers Street (IRT Broadway–Seventh Avenue Line), at West Broadway serving the 1, 2, and 3 trains

There is no bus service west of North End Avenue. From there, the M22 bus runs the entire length of the street, with eastbound buses heading south on Broadway. The M20 uses the street west of West Broadway westbound, or West Street eastbound.
