= Foley Square =

Intersection in Manhattan, New York

Coordinates: 40.7147°N 74.0028°W

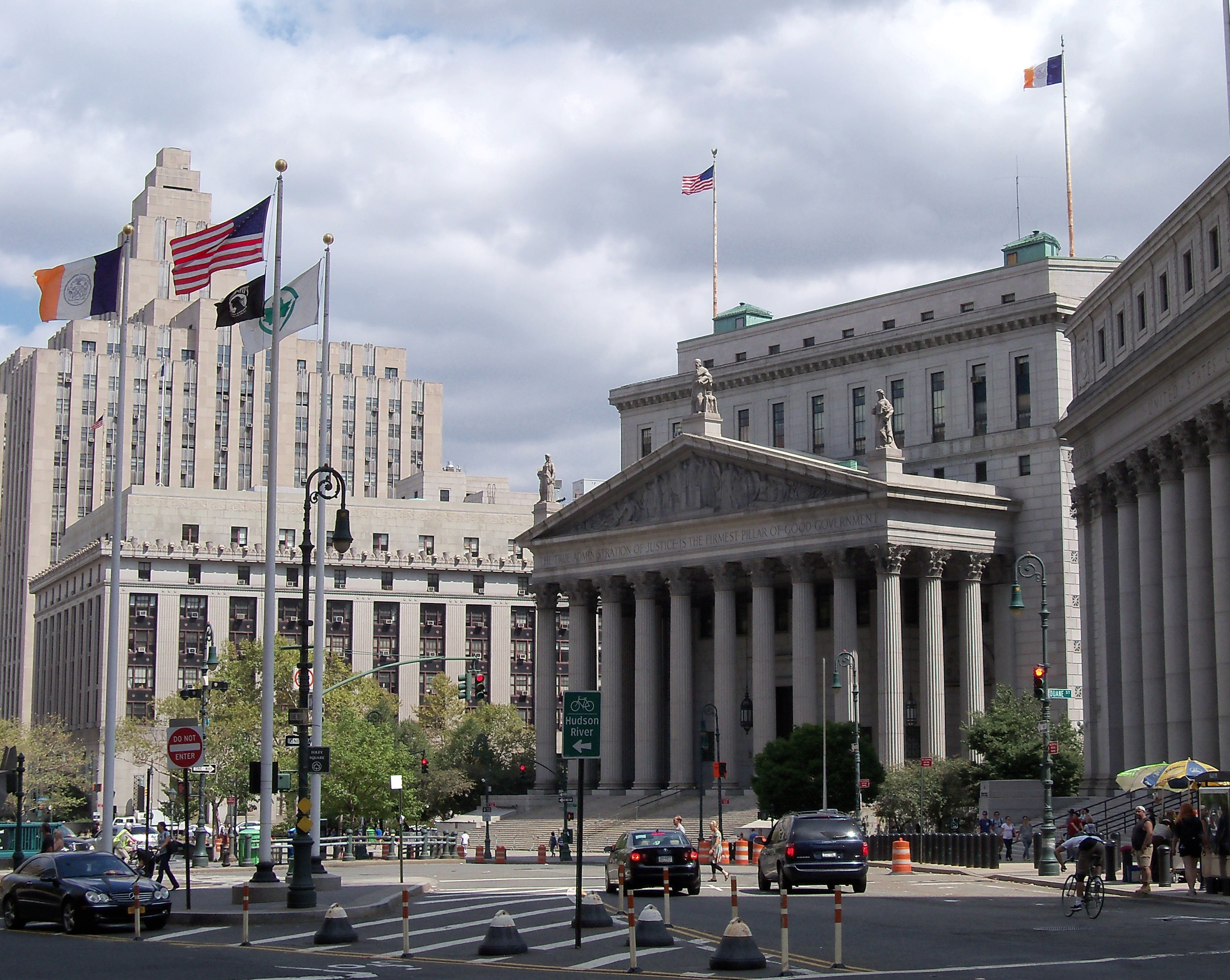
The New York County Courthouse on Foley Square

Foley Square is a street intersection in the Civic Center neighborhood of Lower Manhattan in New York City, which contains a small triangular park named Thomas Paine Park. The space is bordered by Worth Street to the north, Centre Street to the east, and Lafayette Street to the west, and is located south of Manhattan's Chinatown and east of Tribeca. It was named after a prominent Tammany Hall district leader and local saloon owner, Thomas F. "Big Tom" Foley (1852–1925).

== Site ==
Foley Square sits on part of the former site of Collect Pond, specifically the smaller portion known as "Little Collect Pond" which used to lie to the south of Collect Pond proper. This was one of the original fresh water sources for the city, but in 1811 was drained and filled in because it had become severely polluted and implicated in typhus and cholera outbreaks. The neighborhood around the pond was the notorious Five Points neighborhood, home of many gangs.

== Description ==
The square is the site of a number of civic buildings including the classic facades and colonnaded entrances of the 1933-built United States Courthouse, fronted by the sculpture Triumph of the Human Spirit by artist Lorenzo Pace; the New York County Courthouse; the Church of St. Andrew; the Thurgood Marshall United States Courthouse – known before 2003 as the Foley Square Courthouse – where the United States Court of Appeals for the Second Circuit is based; the Manhattan Municipal Building; the Ted Weiss Federal Building and the Jacob K. Javits Federal Building and Court of International Trade.

Also featured in the square are five bronze historical medallions, set flush into areas of the surrounding sidewalks, telling the history of the park and its surroundings, including one for the "Negro Burial Ground", an 18th-century African-American burial ground unearthed during construction of the square. This burial ground has been preserved as the African Burial Ground National Monument.

Tilted Arc, a public art installation by Richard Serra, was displayed in the square from 1981 until it was removed amid controversy in 1989. In 2005, Thomas Paine Park was established as a part of the square.

Foley Square has been used several times for special purposes. It was used as a triage center on September 11, 2001. The Foley Square Greenmarket operates year-round at the corner of Centre Street between Worth and Pearl Streets, and offers baked goods as well as local farm picked fruits and vegetables which are guaranteed to have been harvested within three days of sale. Because of its proximity to Chinatown, Foley Square is often host to a large group of people performing tai chi in the mornings.

=== Site of protests ===
On November 17, 2011, Foley Square was the site of a protest which was part of the Occupy Wall Street movement, which took place after the protestors had been removed from nearby Zuccotti Park. Thousands of people attended the rally, including members of a dozen different unions.

Foley Square has been the site of many other protests and rallies. In December 2014, many thousands gathered there to protest the decision in the death of Eric Garner. In November 2016, in protest of the Dakota Access Pipeline and in solidarity with Standing Rock water protectors, dozens of the thousands of protesters were arrested. In January 2017, to protest the first inauguration of Donald Trump, a collection of activist groups organized a rally titled "NYC Stand Against Trump", held at Foley Square. Foley Square is also the site of the annual Queer Liberation March, an annual LGBTQIA+ rights protest organized by the Reclaim Pride Coalition in response to perceived corporate co-opting and loss of protest principles by the NYC Pride March.

During the second presidency of Donald Trump, Foley Square became another hub for immigration protests, due to the alleged abuses committed inside the nearby Jacob K. Javits Federal Building (26 Federal Plaza), within which many immigrants being held during their immigration trials have typically been held for processing, and potential deportation/other removals; arrests of Democratic Party politician Brad Lander and immigrant activist Jumaane Williams within 26 Federal Plaza drew further protests during that presidential term.

== Gallery ==
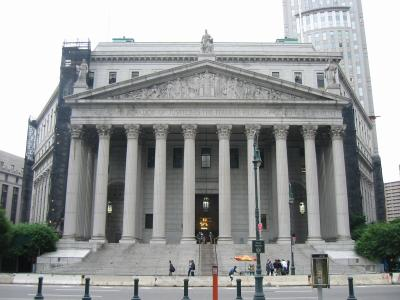
New York County Supreme Court at 60 Centre Street

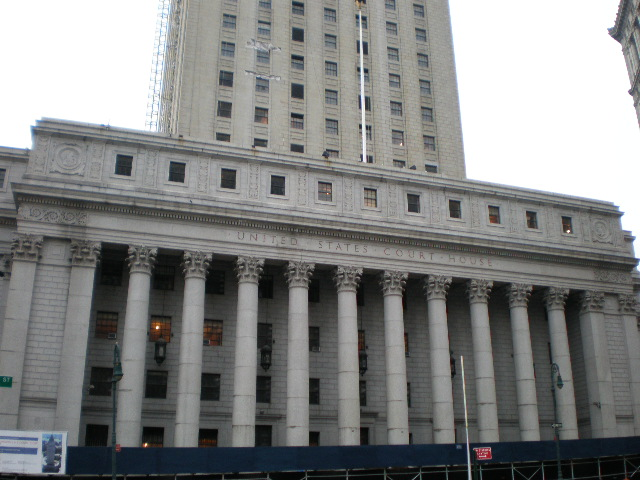
Thurgood Marshall United States Courthouse at 40 Centre Street

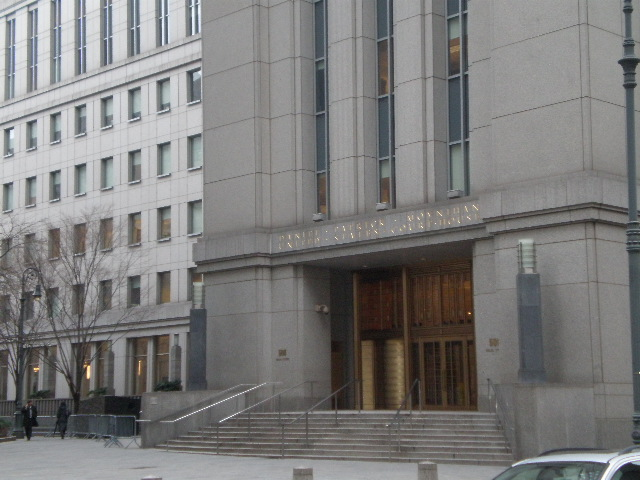
Daniel Patrick Moynihan United States Courthouse at 500 Pearl Street

== See also ==
- Foley Square trial
