= Thurgood Marshall United States Courthouse =

Office skyscraper in Manhattan, New York

- U.S. Courthouse
- U.S. National Register of Historic Places
- New York State Register of Historic Places
- New York City Landmark
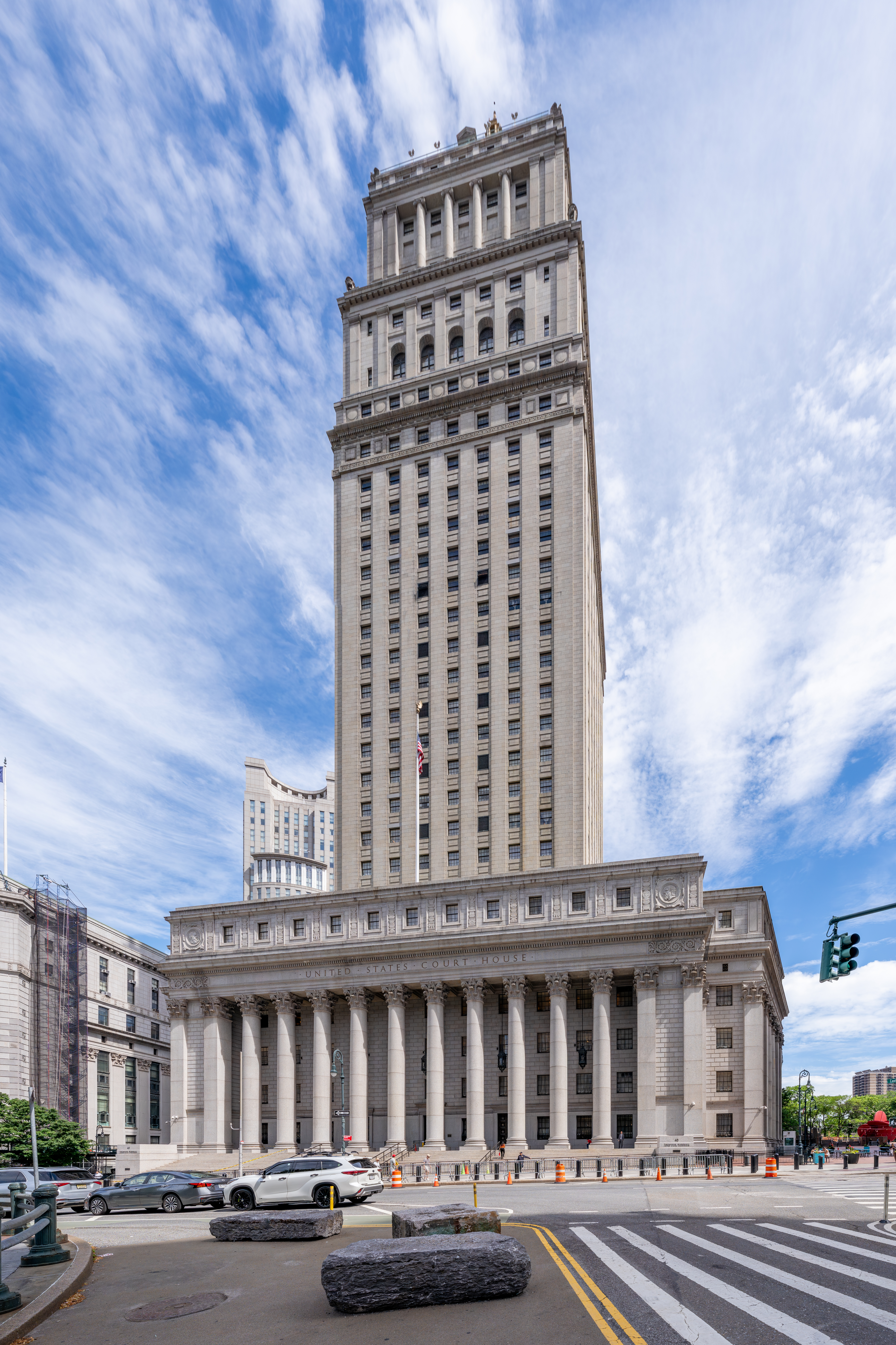
- (2026)
- Location: 40 Centre Street; Manhattan, New York City
- Coordinates: landmark_region:US-NY 40°42′49″N 74°0′10″W
- Built: 1932–1936
- Architect: Cass Gilbert, Cass Gilbert Jr.
- Architectural style: Classical Revival
- NRHP reference No.: 87001596
- NYSRHP No.: 06101.003318
- NYCL No.: 0883

Significant dates
- Added to NRHP: September 2, 1987
- Designated NYSRHP: August 2, 1982
- Designated NYCL: March 25, 1975

The Thurgood Marshall United States Courthouse (originally the United States Courthouse or the Foley Square Courthouse) is a 37-story courthouse at 40 Centre Street on Foley Square in the Civic Center neighborhood of Lower Manhattan in New York City, United States. Opened in 1936, the building was designed by Cass Gilbert and his son, Cass Gilbert Jr., in the Classical Revival style. The United States Court of Appeals for the Second Circuit and the United States District Court for the Southern District of New York hear cases in the courthouse, which is across the street from the Metropolitan Correctional Center, New York City. It is listed on the National Register of Historic Places and is a New York City designated landmark.

The building is divided into two parts: a six-story base and a 31-story office tower. The facade of the structure is made of gray Minnesota granite. The base of the courthouse, built around three interior courtyards, occupies an irregular lot. The main entrance on Centre Street contains a portico accessed by massive granite steps, while the remainder of the base contains flat pilasters. A square tower, recessed from the base, rises to a small setback on the 27th floor and a pyramidal roof above the 30th. The main hall, spanning the width of the building along Centre Street, is decorated with marble floors and walls and a coffered ceiling. The building also contains 35 courtrooms, as well as a double-height library on the 25th floor.

The courthouse was proposed in 1928 because of overcrowding at the City Hall Post Office and Courthouse. Construction began in July 1932 and lasted three and a half years; it was among the first federal skyscrapers constructed. After Gilbert's death, his son Cass Gilbert Jr. supervised construction. The building opened on January 15, 1936, and was renovated in the 1990s. The United States Congress passed a bill renaming the building in honor of former United States Supreme Court justice Thurgood Marshall in 2001, and the courthouse was rededicated on April 15, 2003. The building underwent extensive renovations from 2006 to 2013.

== Site ==
The United States Courthouse is in the Civic Center neighborhood of Lower Manhattan in New York City, United States. It occupies most section of the city block bounded by Centre Street and Foley Square to the northwest, Pearl Street to the north, Cardinal Hayes Place to the southeast, and St. Andrews Plaza to the south. The irregularly shaped land lot covers 74,180 square feet (6,892 m^{2}), with a frontage of 205.58 feet (63 m) on Pearl Street and a depth of 381.25 feet (116 m). The courthouse is flanked by two high-rise government buildings: the Manhattan Municipal Building to the south and the Daniel Patrick Moynihan United States Courthouse to the north. Adjacent to the Thurgood Marshall U.S. Courthouse, and also facing Foley Square, is the New York County Courthouse to the north. The building also abuts St. Andrew Church to the southeast and the Metropolitan Correctional Center, New York, jail to the east.

Historically, the site of the Thurgood Marshall U.S. Courthouse was occupied by the southern portion of Collect Pond. By the mid-19th century, slums and tenements had been developed in the area, which had become known as Five Points. The area was redeveloped into the Civic Center in the early 20th century, with the construction of various city government buildings there. Just prior to the construction of the present courthouse, the site had contained the New York City Board of Health building.

== History ==
Prior to the construction of the current courthouse, the City Hall Post Office had contained federal offices and courtrooms. The post office building had become overcrowded by 1928, when the federal government of the United States acquired land on Church Street for a new federal office building. Federal jurists advocated for their own courthouse, leading the United States Department of the Treasury to approve a second building in 1930.

=== Development ===
As early as 1930, the architectural firm of McKim, Mead & White had drawn up designs for a federal courthouse at Centre and Pearl Streets, replacing the New York City Board of Health building. Architect Cass Gilbert was commissioned to design a new federal courthouse at Foley Square, and Gilbert submitted plans for the courthouse to the Treasury Department in February 1932. The 38-story building, composed of a 7-story base and 31-story tower, would contain all offices for the United States District Court for the Southern District of New York. In June 1932, the federal government acquired the Health Department Building from the government of New York City, selling the City Hall Post Office to the city. In addition, the city and the St. Andrew Church swapped two land parcels, since the church owned some property that was to be part of the courthouse.

In July 1932, the federal government hired the George J. Atwell Foundation Corporation to excavate the site of the courthouse. The U.S. Treasury had approved the exterior design, but the interior arrangement was still being finalized. A groundbreaking ceremony for the building was held on July 20, 1932. The federal government solicited bids for the courthouse's construction in January 1933, with each bidder submitting three cost estimates for different construction materials. James Stewart & Co. submitted a low bid for granite, while the N. P. Severin Company submitted a low bid for limestone. The Treasury decided to build the courthouse out of granite, awarding a contract to James Stewart & Co. for $5.996 million on January 20, 1933. The contractor was given 720 business days to finish the job.

Lawyers and federal officials laid the building's cornerstone on March 1, 1933. The next month, Bethlehem Steel subsidiary McClintic-Marshall Company received a contract to manufacture 10,500 short tons (9,400 long tons; 9,500 t) of steel for the building. After Gilbert's death in 1934, construction was supervised by his son Cass Gilbert Jr. until its completion. The courthouse was originally known as the Foley Square Courthouse and was among the first federal skyscrapers constructed. By early 1935, James Stewart & Co. planned to finish the building before that August.

=== Usage ===
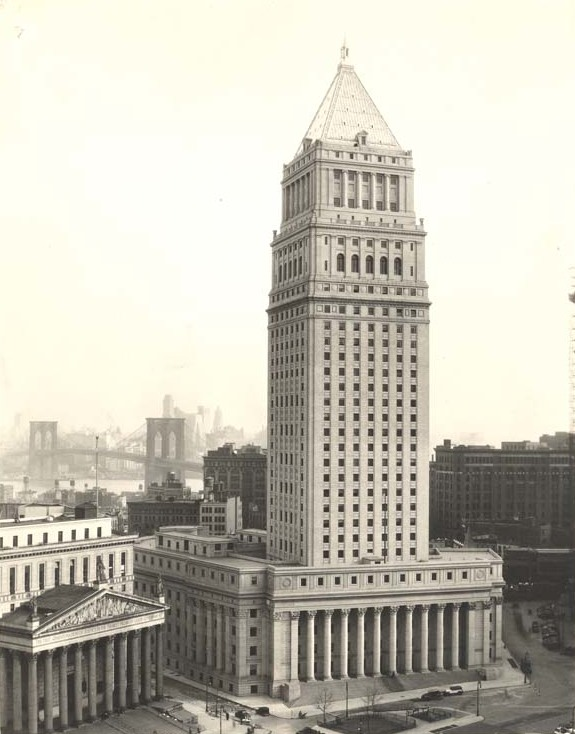
The Thurgood Marshall United States Courthouse in 1936, the year of its opening

The Federal Courthouse was one of two skyscrapers in Manhattan completed in 1935, the other being Rockefeller Center's International Building. Judges did not move into the courthouse until January 15, 1936. The new building had 10 courtrooms for cases with juries and four courtrooms for cases that did not require juries. Notable events over the years that have occurred in the courthouse include the espionage conspiracy trial of Julius and Ethel Rosenberg; the guilty plea of Ivan Boesky to conspiracy charges; and the trial of Martha Stewart.

==== 20th century ====
In 1942, the federal government sued the city government, requesting that the city pay $5.2 million as part of the land swap. The city government unsuccessfully petitioned the Supreme Court of the United States to rule on the dispute, and the city had paid for the land in full by the end of 1945. The city government was planning to redevelop the surrounding area by 1948. Under the plan, the United States Courthouse would be the central structure of a new "civic center", surrounded by several public buildings. The Federal Bureau of Investigation (FBI) also occupied nine stories in the United States Courthouse until 1952, when the FBI leased other space nearby.

The government of New York City proposed redeveloping the Civic Center in 1962 as part of the "ABC plan". Several structures were to have been demolished to make way for a new Civic Center municipal building and a plaza, although the United States Courthouse would have remained in place. The General Services Administration planned to rearrange the interior of the United States Courthouse, but a federal judge placed an injunction on the plans in 1963. The city presented a revised proposal for the neighborhood in April 1964. As part of the Civic Center redevelopment, in 1965, the U.S. government proposed constructing a new building (later the Jacob K. Javits Federal Building) to house appellate courts and eleven federal agencies. This would free up about 32,000 square feet (3,000 m^{2}) in the courthouse building. The building's facade was also washed in mid-1965 for the first time in three decades.

The New York City Landmarks Preservation Commission designated the United States Courthouse as a New York City landmark on March 25, 1975. The same year, the adjacent Metropolitan Correctional Center, New York, jail opened to the east. The United States Attorney's office was also relocated from the courthouse to the jail building. Although the new jail was not directly visible from Foley Square, it was connected to the courthouse via a footbridge. The building was slightly damaged by flooding in 1977, after a water main broke.

The United States Courthouse was listed on the National Register of Historic Places on September 2, 1987. In 1992, three large historic courtrooms were restored. The courthouse was substantially renovated in 1999.

==== Renaming and renovation ====
The United States Courthouse originally did not have an official name. In 1999, the United States Congress proposed renaming the courthouse after the late Supreme Court of the United States justice Thurgood Marshall. Before being elevated to the Supreme Court, Marshall had worked at the courthouse from 1961 to 1965 as a judge of the Second Circuit Court of Appeals. The United States Congress passed a bill in 2001, renaming the building in honor of Thurgood Marshall. The legislation was signed into law on August 20, 2001, and the building was rededicated on April 15, 2003.

In November 2006, the Second Circuit left the Marshall Courthouse while the building underwent extensive renovations. During this period, the Daniel Patrick Moynihan U.S. Courthouse across the street temporarily housed the Second Circuit. To make way for additional mechanical systems, four elevators in the tower were truncated to the 17th floor, the highest story accessible by members of the public. Pipes and wiring were installed in the upper portions of these elevator shafts, and mechanical equipment was installed in the attic, which had a low ceiling. Some of the new wires and pipes were concealed behind existing decorations. For example, air-conditioning ducts were installed under the floor of the double-height library, while a sprinkler was placed within the library's mezzanine. The Second Circuit returned to the Marshall Courthouse in early 2013 after renovations were completed.

== Architecture ==
=== Exterior ===
The building has two major parts: an irregular six-story base and a square tower with a lantern. In total, the building is 590 feet (180 m) tall and 37 stories. On all elevations of the facade, the building is clad with off-white Minnesota granite, mottled with peach and gray colors. The building's windows largely consist of single-glazed panes, coated with a blast-resistant film.

==== Base ====
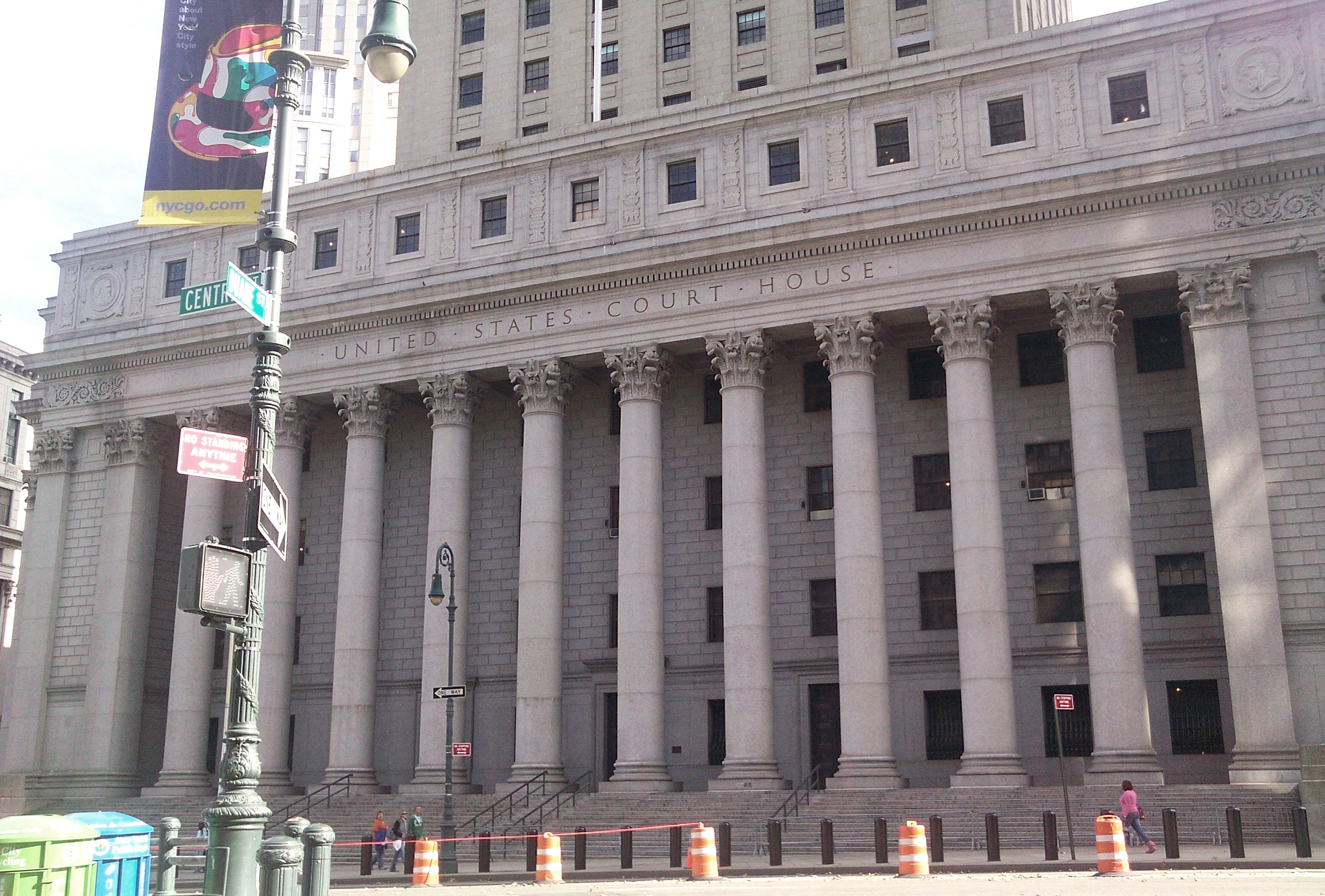
The colonnade of Corinthian columns

The base measures 321 by 234 feet (98 by 71 m). It is six stories high, excluding the basement story. The site slopes downward to the north; as a result, there are entrances to the building's basement from Pearl Street. The facade contains a colonnade of round columns on Centre Street, as well as flat pilasters on the other elevations. Built around three interior courtyards, the base is irregularly shaped, following the outline of the site. On all elevations, the first four stories are clad with rusticated granite blocks. The building's cornerstone is made of granite and contains the names of Treasury secretary Ogden L. Mills, assistant Treasury secretary Ferry K. Heath, architect Cass Gilbert, and supervising architect James A. Wetmore.

Massive granite steps flanked by large pedestals lead up to the main entrance on Foley Square. Gilbert intended the pedestals to bear two monumental sculptural groups, but they were never executed. On Centre Street, ten quadruple-height Corinthian columns form a colonnade, behind which is the main entrance portico. There are windows recessed behind this portico, as well as flat pilasters on either side of the colonnade. The words "United States Court House" are inscribed on the fifth-story frieze, which does not have any windows. The frieze is carved with a detailed floral design. The ends of the entablature above are embellished with roundels, designed to resemble ancient coins, on which are carved the heads of four ancient lawgivers: Plato, Aristotle, Demosthenes, and Moses. Above this entablature is a cornice with denticulated blocks. The sixth story is treated as an attic, with rectangular windows separated by pilasters. A bronze flagpole rises above the portico.

On the other elevations of the base, there are pilasters topped by Corinthian capitals, which are similar to those above the columns in the portico. The pilasters face north toward Pearl Street and east toward Cardinal Hayes Place. The northeast corner of the building, facing east, is rounded off. The first floor is mostly above ground level, except at the southwestern end, where it abuts St. Andrew Church. At that location, the first floor is the same height as the ground. Above the sixth story, the base has a green roof covering 21,000 square feet (2,000 m^{2}). The green roof also includes a 10,000-U.S.-gallon (38,000 L) rainwater tank, which was intended to reduce the building's water consumption by 25 percent compared to a conventional building of the same size.

==== Tower ====
The tower is a square measuring 100 by 100 feet (30 by 30 m). It is set back from the base parallel to the front of the building on Centre Street. On the first sixteen stories above the base (consisting of the 7th through 22nd floors), each elevation is divided vertically into multiple bays, each with one window. The bays are separated vertically by projecting piers and horizontally by rectangular spandrel panels. Above the 22nd floor, a denticulated cornice runs horizontally across all elevations of the facade. There are seven square windows on each elevation at the 23rd story. On the 24th and 25th floors, each elevation contains seven bays separated by double-height pilasters. On each elevation, each of the five central bays contains a double-height arched window, above which is a square window; the two outer bays contain narrow rectangular windows.

At the 27th floor, the tower contains a small setback and is surrounded by a parapet. The setback section is marked by urns at the corners. Above the setback, the tower rises for three additional stories and contains five bays on each elevation. The bays are separated by triple-height engaged columns designed in the Ionic order, and there are two pilasters on each end of either elevation. These columns and pilasters support a cornice and a small attic. The top of the tower contains stone eagles at each corner, between which are low parapets. The eagles and parapets surround the steep pyramidal roof.

The roof of the tower is pyramidal, pitched steeply, and made of terracotta clad in gold leaf. Before he was hired to design the United States Courthouse, Gilbert had designed the roof of the New York Life Building in a similar style. The lowest section of the roof contains a small dormer window on each elevation. Above that are three additional levels of dormer windows. There is also a small open lantern, also gold-glazed terracotta, at the top. The base of the lantern is surrounded by a railing, while the lantern's corners and steep roof contain finials.

=== Interior ===
The public interior spaces were intended as "ceremonial spaces". Under Gilbert's original plan, visitors would access these spaces in a specific order, passing through the portico, the lobby, and various hallways before reaching the courtrooms. The ceremonial spaces were then ornamented by details, such as plaster ceilings, in a particular color scheme. Gilbert died before the interior designs were finished; as a result, the interior spaces were executed in a different color palette than Gilbert had planned.

==== Main hall ====
The main hall spans the width of the building along its principal elevation on Centre Street. It is very similar in design and ornamentation to the main hall of the United States Supreme Court building, which Gilbert designed at the same time. Twenty-nine feet in height, it has green- and black-veined white marble floors; the white marble that lines its walls has gold- and cream-colored veining. There are double-height Ionic pilasters superimposed onto the marble walls. The ceiling is made of plaster and wood and is divided into seven rectangular, coffered sections. These coffers are separated from each other by elaborate moldings with Greek key motifs. The coffers are decorated with large plaster rosettes tipped with 22-karat gold leaf on alternating backgrounds of crimson and peacock blue, with smaller rosettes at the junctions of the coffers.

Richly ornamental bronzework surrounds many of the interior doors, including those of the elevators. The elevator doors are made of steel, painted in a gold color; they were initially supposed to be made of brass, but these plans were changed to save money. This bronze detailing features an unusual combination of metaphorical images related to law and government, including dolphins, an erudite if somewhat obscure symbol of birth and democratic ideals. Among the other motifs are grasshoppers apparently feeding on stalks of wheat, accompanied by the Greek word meta, meaning "to transform", which conveys the idea that change, even conflict, is essential to growth; there are also owls, representing wisdom, and acorns and oak leaves, signifying strength and endurance.

==== Courtrooms and offices ====
Variations on the decorative motifs employed within the main hall appear throughout the rest of the interior. The building contains 35 courtrooms. Sixteen are original to the courthouse: five in the base and eleven in the tower, including the historic United States Court of Appeals courtroom. Many of the smaller courtrooms have been significantly modified, but many of the larger courtrooms retain their original decorations. All have wood-paneled walls with colossal round arches and fluted Ionic pilasters; the Greek key molding seen in the main hall also frames the ceilings of the tower courtrooms. The Court of Appeals courtroom ceiling also depicts nautical symbols.

There are 11 elevators, of which four only operate to the 17th floor, the highest floor that is open to the public. The upper floors mostly contain offices, which retain little of the original decorations or layout. Within the tower, at the twenty-fifth floor, a double-height library features large ceiling beams supported by brackets painted with stenciled foliate designs. The library largely retains its original design, although a balcony has been added to increase the capacity of the stacks. The library's high arched windows overlook of the Manhattan skyline.

== Impact ==
The courthouse was not unanimously well received when it was completed. Modernist architecture proponent and sociologist Lewis Mumford called it "the supreme example of pretentiousness, mediocrity, bad design and fake grandeur." Christopher Gray of The New York Times wrote: "The total composition, seen from Foley Square, is impressive but not inspirational." On the other hand, Lee E. Cooper of the Times wrote in 1935: "This is the type of work in which the designer of the Woolworth Building took great pride," referring to how Gilbert had also designed the Woolworth Building nearby. Paul Goldberger of the same paper wrote that the United States Courthouse's staircase, along with that of the neighboring New York County Courthouse, "create a strong urban order that gives definition to the east side of Foley Square".

The front steps of the Federal Courthouse, along with that of the neighboring New York County Courthouse, have also been used as a filming location. Court administrator Steven Flanders told The Wall Street Journal in 1989: "The steps are where fantasy and reality seem to merge into a spectacle that the public can't resist."

== See also ==
- Foley Square trial
- List of New York City Designated Landmarks in Manhattan below 14th Street
- National Register of Historic Places listings in Manhattan below 14th Street
