= Centre Street (Manhattan) =

Street in Manhattan, New York

Coordinates: 40°43′02″N 74°00′02″W

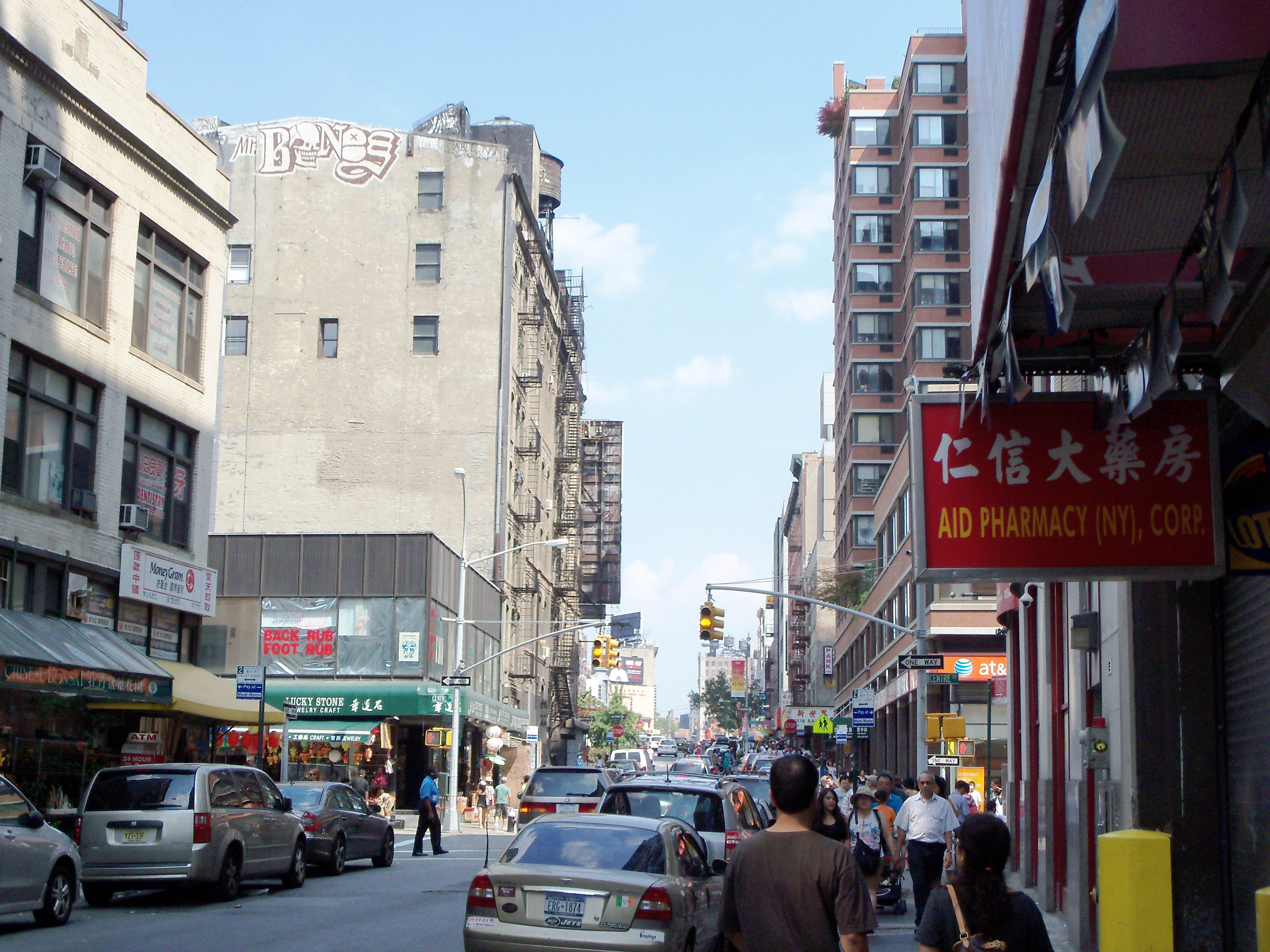
The intersection of Walker and Centre Streets in Chinatown (曼哈頓華埠), looking east from the vicinity of 99 Walker Street

Centre Street is a north–south street in the New York City borough of Manhattan, running through the Civic Center, Chinatown, and Little Italy neighborhoods of Lower Manhattan. It connects Park Row to the south with Cleveland Place to the north. Centre Street carries northbound traffic north of Reade Street and two-way traffic between Reade Street and the Brooklyn Bridge.

In the early 19th century there was no Centre Street. The area was previously occupied by the Collect Pond, a body of fresh water that was the nascent city's primary supply of drinking water, covering approximately 48 acres (190,000 m^{2}) and running as deep as 50 feet (15 m). The pond was located just north of today's Foley Square and just west of modern Chinatown. It had been drained and the new street grid built over it a decade earlier. However, there was no street built between Pearl and Reade Streets. Cross Street (which came over from the nearby area that would several years later be dubbed the "Five Points") ran all the way through to Reade, and a single block ran from Reade to Chambers, and afterwards turned east and ran into Chatham Street (future Park Row). In the previous century, this block, then ending at the Collect Pond, was labeled "Potter's Hill". North of Pearl Street, a separate street occupying the alignment was called "Collect Street". By 1828, it would be renamed Centre Street, but still end at Pearl from the north. As late as 1836, one map would still show this arrangement, but in another the full alignment would be in place.

In colloquial usage, "Centre Street" may refer to the several courts or government offices along the street in the vicinity of Foley Square. 1 Centre Street is the Manhattan Municipal Building, 40 Centre Street is the Thurgood Marshall United States Courthouse (home of the United States Court of Appeals for the Second Circuit), 60 and 80 Centre Street are the civil division of the New York County Supreme Court, and 100 Centre Street is the criminal division of the New York County Supreme Court. That courthouse lent its address to a short-lived TV show of the same name. The courthouse is also home to the office of the Manhattan District Attorney, although its entrance is at 1 Hogan Place. 111 Centre Street is the New York City Civil Court. The New York City Department of Health and Mental Hygiene is at 125 Worth Street, at the corner of Centre Street. Farther north, 240 Centre Street was the headquarters of the New York Police Department from 1909 until 1973, although that building is now residential. Additionally, the Museum of Chinese in America is located at 215 Centre Street, in Chinatown.

== Transportation ==
The uptown M1 runs on Centre Street between Grand Street and Cleveland Place. The westbound M22 runs from Reade to Chambers Streets.

The BMT Nassau Street Line runs under Centre Street south of Kenmare Street, stopping at Canal Street and Chambers Street.
