= Manhattan Municipal Building =

Office skyscraper in Manhattan, New York

- U.S. National Register of Historic Places
- New York State Register of Historic Places
- New York City Landmark
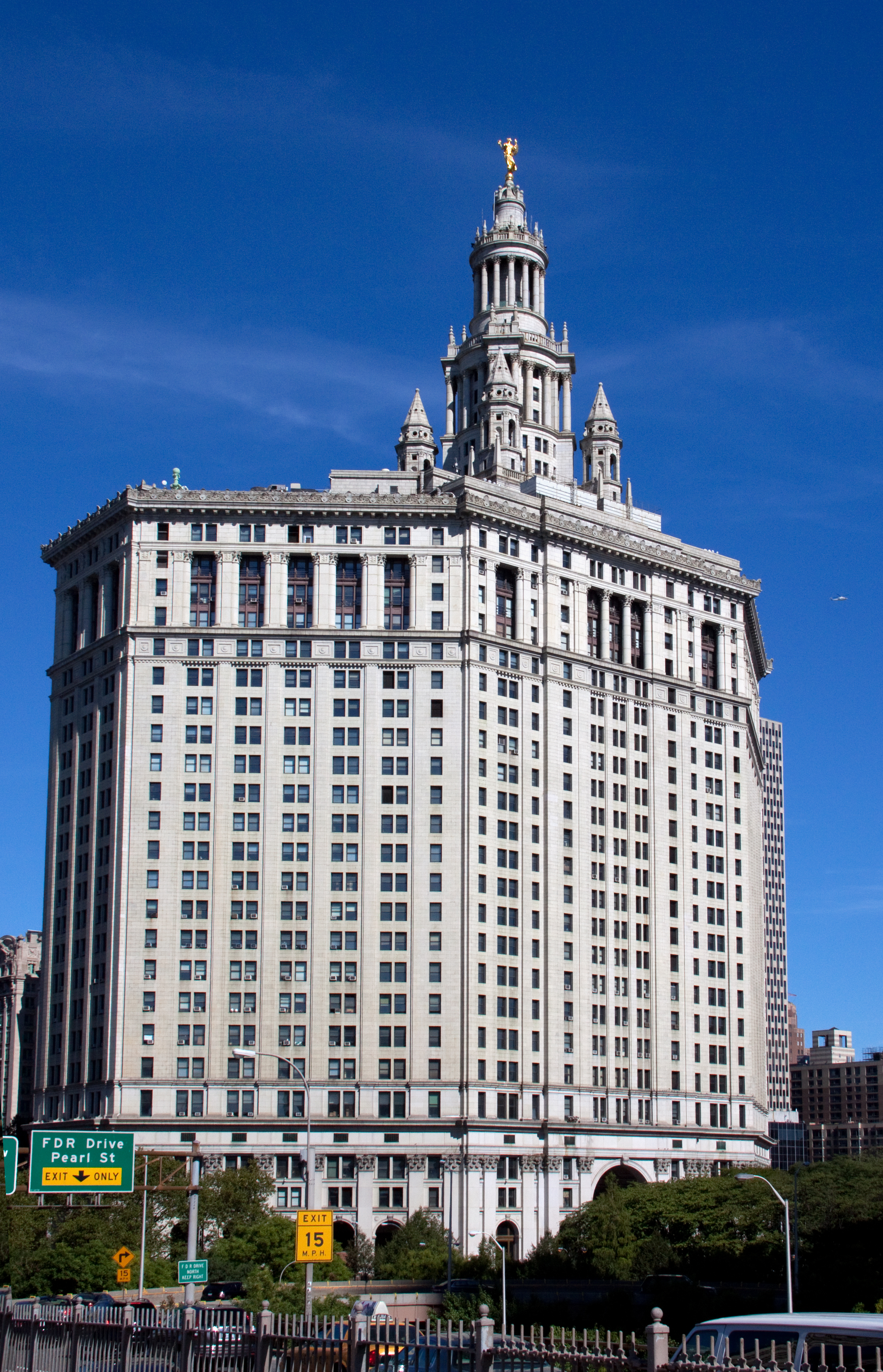
- Location: Manhattan, New York City
- Coordinates: 40°42′47″N 74°00′14″W
- Built: 1909–1914
- Architect: William M. Kendall of McKim, Mead & White
- Architectural style: Mixture of: Ancient Roman; Beaux-Arts; French Renaissance; Renaissance
- NRHP reference No.: 72000879
- NYSRHP No.: 06101.000372
- NYCL No.: 0079

Significant dates
- Added to NRHP: October 18, 1972
- Designated NYSRHP: August 2, 1982
- Designated NYCL: February 1, 1966

The David N. Dinkins Municipal Building (originally the Municipal Building and later known as the Manhattan Municipal Building) is a 40-story, 580-foot (180 m) building at 1 Centre Street, east of Chambers Street, in the Civic Center neighborhood of Manhattan in New York City, United States. The structure was built to accommodate increased governmental space demands after the 1898 consolidation of the city's five boroughs. Construction began in 1909 and continued through 1914 at a total cost of $12 million (equivalent to $284,515,000 in 2025).

Designed by McKim, Mead & White, the Manhattan Municipal Building was among the last buildings erected as part of the City Beautiful movement in New York. Its architectural style has been characterized as Roman Imperial, Italian Renaissance, French Renaissance, or Beaux-Arts. The Municipal Building is one of the largest governmental buildings in the world, with about 1 million square feet (93,000 m^{2}) of office space. The base incorporates a subway station, while the top includes the gilded Civic Fame statue.

The Municipal Building was erected after three previous competitions to build a single municipal building for New York City's government had failed. In 1907, the city's Commissioner of Bridges held a competition to design the building in conjunction with a subway and trolley terminal at the Brooklyn Bridge, of which McKim, Mead & White's plan was selected. The first offices in the Municipal Building were occupied by 1913. In later years, it received several renovations, including elevator replacements in the 1930s and restorations in the mid-1970s and the late 1980s. The New York City Landmarks Preservation Commission designated the building a landmark in 1966, and it was listed on the National Register of Historic Places in 1972. In October 2015, the building was renamed after David N. Dinkins, New York City's first African-American mayor.

== Site ==
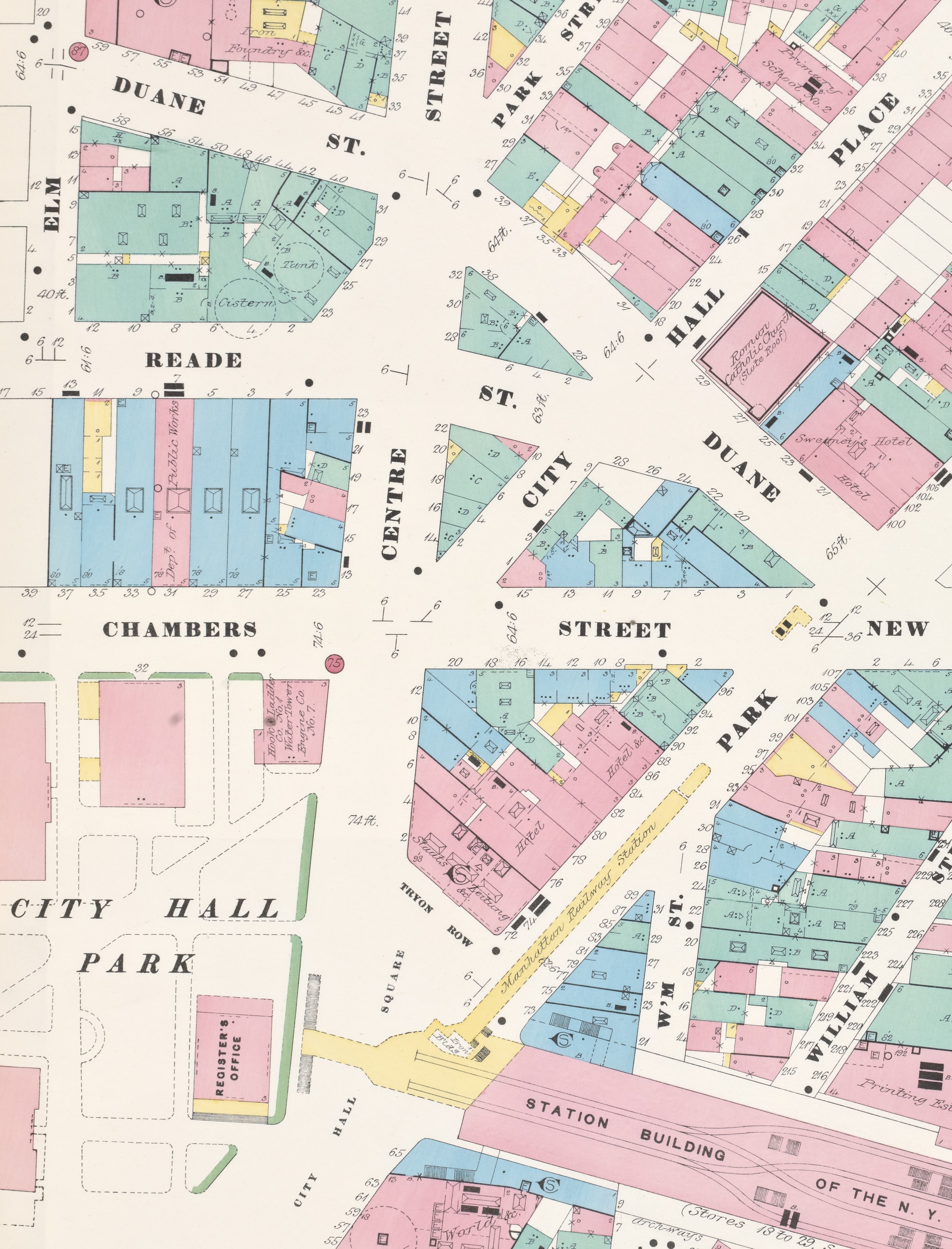
The Manhattan Municipal Building occupies the site bounded on this map by Centre Street, Duane Street, and Park Row.

The Manhattan Municipal Building is located on the eastern side of Centre Street, in the Civic Center of Manhattan in New York City, United States. It occupies the length of two city blocks, between Duane Street to the north and the Brooklyn Bridge ramps to the south. The west–east Chambers Street has its eastern terminus at Centre Street, at the center of the building's base. The site had a frontage of approximately 448 feet (137 m) on Centre Street to the west, 361 ft (110 m) on Park Row to the southeast, 339 ft (103 m) on Duane Street to the northeast, and 71 ft (22 m) on Tryon Row to the east; except for Centre Street, all of these streets have been relocated or removed. Near the Municipal Building are the Thurgood Marshall United States Courthouse and St. Andrew Church to the northeast; 1 Police Plaza and the Metropolitan Correctional Center to the east; Surrogate's Courthouse and Tweed Courthouse to the west; and New York City Hall to the southwest.

Prior to the Municipal Building's construction, several streets passed through the building site, which had been located at the south end of the Five Points neighborhood. New Chambers Street continued east through the center of the building, while the west-east Reade Street continued eastward through what is now the building's northern edge. City Hall Place (now Cardinal Hayes Place) originated at the intersection of Chambers and Centre Streets, crossing southwest–northeast through the building site. The area to the south of the Municipal Building was once known as Tryon Row, a one-block east–west street between Centre Street and Park Row. The Municipal Building's site was occupied by buildings including the old headquarters of the New Yorker Staats-Zeitung. Immediately to the south were two elevated railway stations: the Park Row Terminal of the Brooklyn Rapid Transit Company (closed 1944) and the City Hall station of the Interborough Rapid Transit Company (closed 1953).

After the Municipal Building was finished, New Chambers Street ran through the building's central archway. Park Row bounded the building to the southeast and Duane Street abutted it to the northeast. Park Row was rerouted in the mid-20th century, and New Chambers and Duane Streets were closed in 1971 as part of the construction of 1 Police Plaza. These streets subsequently became part of a pedestrian plaza surrounding the Municipal Building and 1 Police Plaza.

== Architecture ==
William M. Kendall of the architectural firm McKim, Mead & White designed the Municipal Building. Two of the firm's other partners, Burt L. Fenner and Teunis J. van der Bent, were tasked with leading construction, while the city's Department of Bridges supervised the project. Alexander Johnson was chief engineer, and Purdy and Henderson were consulting engineers. In addition, the Thompson–Starrett Company was the general contractor. The Mount Waldo Construction Company provided the granite, while Robert Wetherill & Co. installed the original elevators. The foundations were dug by the Foundation Company. The building's architectural style, influential in the civic construction of other American cities, has been "variously described as Roman Imperial, Italian Renaissance, French Renaissance, or Beaux-Arts", according to architectural writers Sarah Landau and Carl W. Condit. Its construction marked the end of the City Beautiful movement in New York.

The Municipal Building is one of the largest governmental buildings in the world, with about 1 million square feet (93,000 m^{2}) of interior space and 2,000 employees. Of this, about 600,000 square feet (56,000 m^{2}) is used for offices. (Note: According to architectural historians Sarah Landau and Carl Condit, when the Municipal Building was completed, it contained 1,250,000 square feet (116,000 m^{2}) of usable space.) The Municipal Building was the first in New York City to incorporate a subway station, the Chambers Street station, below its base. The approved building plans in 1909 also called for three basement levels within the volume not occupied by the subway station. The building features various types of sculpture and relief. These include the large gilded Civic Fame statue at the top of the building; smaller sculptural groups; and plaques and coats-of-arms representing the various governments that have ruled Manhattan.

=== Form ===
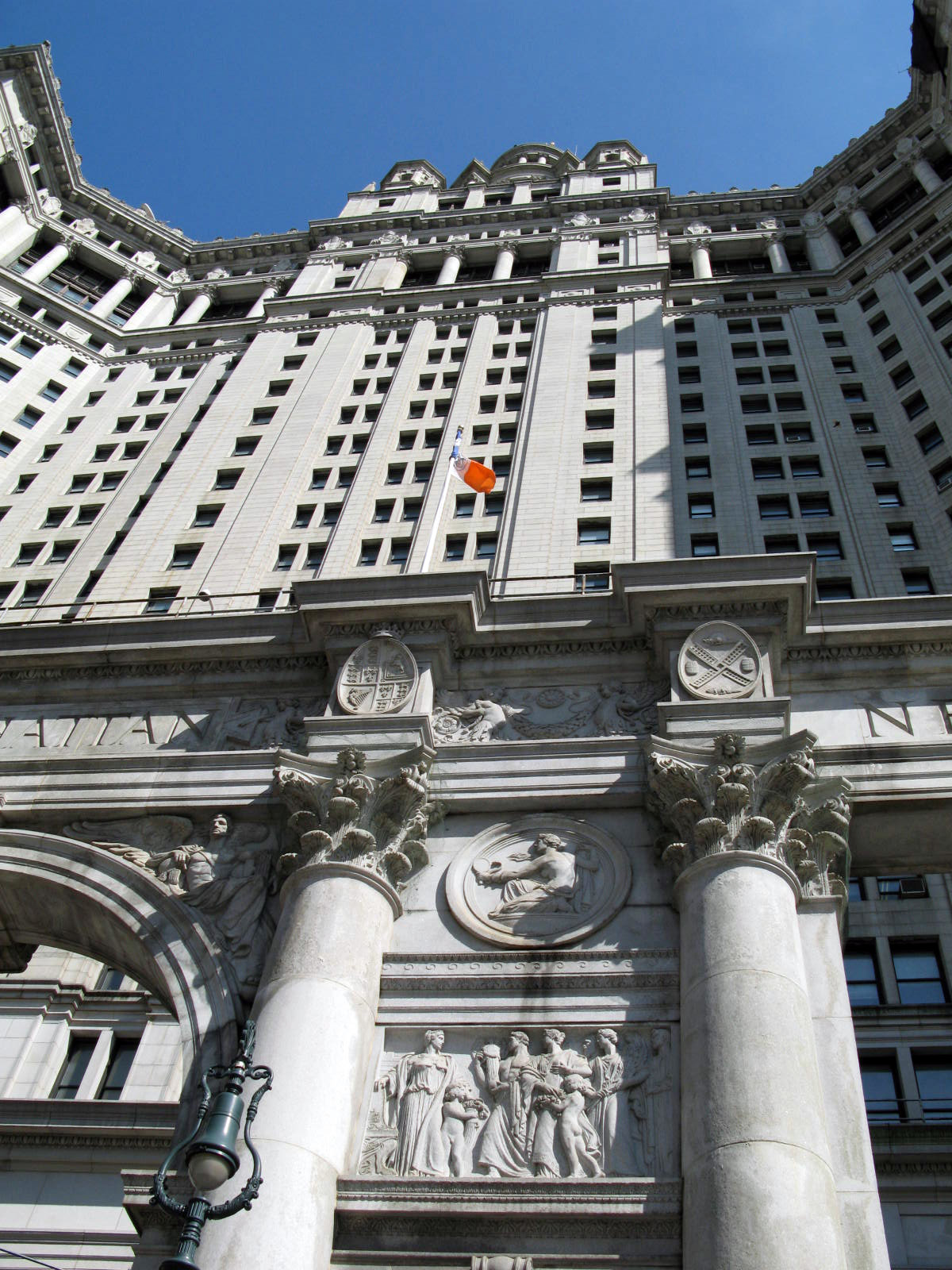
Seen from below

The building is shaped like a ten-sided "C", although the lot that it occupies is an irregular hexagon. The main facade, along Centre Street to the west, is 381 feet (116 m) long, while the eastern facade is 168 feet (51 m) long. The building has a width of 168.5 feet (51.4 m), measured from west to east. The northeastern and southeastern sides accommodated the diagonal paths of Duane Street and Park Row, respectively. The floors' north–south axes are longer than their west–east axes; the wings of the "C" face west. This floor plan ensured that all of the building's windows would be able to receive direct sunlight and eliminated the need for an interior light court.

The Manhattan Municipal Building is 34 stories tall; the main structure consists of 26 stories, and a tower rises eight stories above the center of the structure. (Note: According to architectural historian Leland M. Roth, the main structure is 24 stories high while the tower is an additional nine stories.) The top of the main structure is about 349 feet (106 m) above ground level. The tower rises to around 560 feet (170 m) above ground level; including the Civic Fame statue, the building stands at around 580 feet (180 m) tall. (Note: Marina Harrison and Lucy D. Rosenfeld cite the building's height as being 582 ft (177 m), while William Walton wrote in 1912 that the building was 583 ft (178 m) tall. Roth quotes the height as being 320 ft (98 m) to the cornice and 552 ft (168 m) to the top of Civic Fame. A contemporary New York Times article cites the building as being 559 ft (170 m) tall.) Atop the northern and southern wings of the "C" are pavilion roofs, which are connected to the central tower with roof decks and a stone cornice. The central tower is composed of a two-story square section. Atop this is a circular section flanked by four circular turrets, one above each corner of the square. The circular section of the central tower is composed of two layers: an enclosed space surrounded by columns, atop which is a smaller peristyle.

==== Civic Fame ====
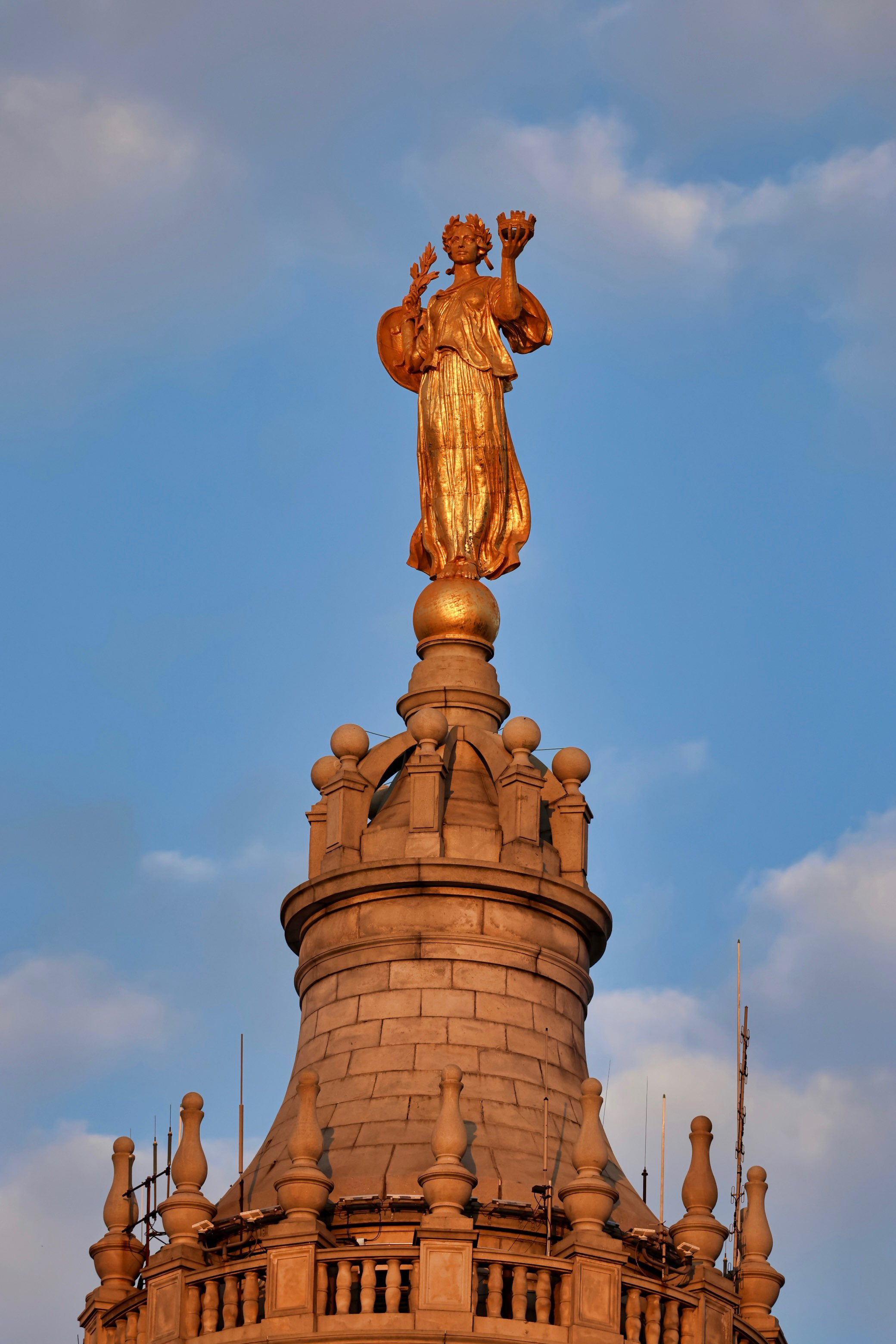
The statue "Civic Fame" on the top of Manhattan's David N. Dinkins Municipal Building

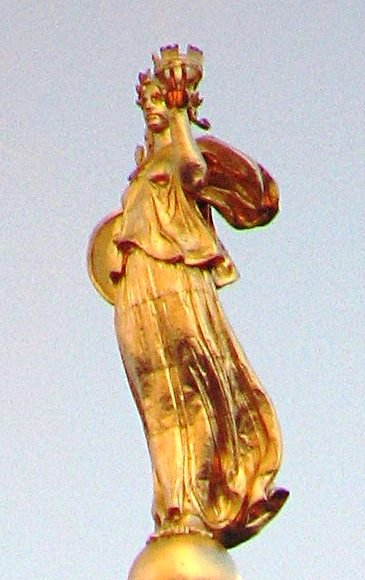
The gilded statue of Civic Fame at the top

On the Municipal Building's roof is Civic Fame, a 25-foot-tall (7.6 m) statue installed in March 1913. The statue is a gilded copper figure, made from about 500 pieces of hammered copper executed by the Manhattan firm of Broschart & Braun. The statue is variously reported to be supported on an iron skeleton and made over a steel frame. Civic Fame has been variously described as the largest or second-largest statue in Manhattan, depending on whether the larger Statue of Liberty is considered as being in Manhattan. It is similar in style to the Statue of Liberty.

The statue was designed by Adolph Alexander Weinman (1870–1952). It was commissioned by the New York City government at a cost of $9,000 (equivalent to $293,000 in 2025) (Note: According to the New York Tribune, the statue cost $6,000 (equivalent to $195,000 in 2025), of which $1,000 was for the clothes and $5,000 for the statue.) to celebrate the consolidation of the five boroughs into the City of New York. The figure is barefoot and balances upon a globe. She carries various symbolic items: a shield bearing the New York City coat of arms, a branch of leaves, and a mural crown, which she holds aloft. The mural crown has five crenellations or turrets, which evoke city walls and represent the five boroughs. The crown also includes dolphins as a symbol of "New York's maritime setting". Audrey Munson posed for the figure; she had also posed for a very large number of other important allegorical Beaux-Arts sculptures in New York, including those at the Alexander Hamilton U.S. Custom House, New York Public Library Main Branch, Manhattan Bridge Colonnade, and USS Maine National Monument at Columbus Circle.

The left arm was repaired in 1928 after cracks were detected on that side. After Civic Fame's 150-pound (68 kg) left arm broke off, fell through a skylight, and landed on the 26th-floor cafeteria in February 1935, the statue was renovated, with metal rods being used to hold up the left arm. The sculpture was refurbished and re-gilded starting in July 1974 at a cost of $294,500, as part of the interior renovations of the Municipal Building; the restoration was completed by the end of the year. In early 1991, while the facade was undergoing renovations, Civic Fame was removed for six months and re-gilded by New Jersey metalwork shop Les Metalliers Champenois. After the restoration was completed at a cost of $900,000, Civic Fame was reinstalled in October 1991.

=== Facade ===
The building is divided vertically into 25 bays on its western elevation; 25 bays combined across the northeastern, southeastern, and eastern elevations; and three bays on its northern and southern elevations. Each bay contains either one or two windows on each story. The facade is made of ashlar granite, except for the details above the 23rd floor, which are made of terracotta. A three-story colonnade of Corinthian columns runs across the base along Centre Street, and the rest of the building is set back behind the colonnade. The colonnade averages 66 feet (20 m) tall, including pedestals, and is topped by a carved entablature. The central portion of the colonnade is freestanding and is flanked by 16 three-quarter columns, each measuring about 6 feet (1.8 m) wide and 52 feet (16 m) tall. Early plans called for statuary above the colonnade, similar to the statuary above St. Peter's Basilica. There is also a false colonnade on the facade above the 22nd floor.

Weinman sculpted the rectangular allegorical bas-relief panels at the base of the building, which are located above the side arches. Civic Duty, above the smaller arch to the right (south) of the center arch, shows a female representation of the city alongside a child holding the city seal. Civic Pride, above the smaller arch to the left (north), depicted the city as a woman "receiving tribute from her citizens". These are respectively topped by medallions representing Progress, a nude kneeling man with a torch in one hand and a winged sphere in the other, and Prudence, a half-nude kneeling woman holding a mirror while a serpent is curled around her right arm. The medallions each measure about 9 feet (2.7 m) wide and are placed immediately below the colonnade's architrave. There are heroic-scaled winged figures in the spandrels above the main arch: Guidance, a depiction of a female in the left spandrel, and Executive Power, a depiction of a male in the right spandrel.

The colonnade is topped by a frieze averaging 64 feet (20 m) high. The word "Manhattan" is inscribed on the frieze immediately above the three arches; it is flanked by inscriptions reading "New Amsterdam" and "New York". Shields relating to Manhattan's historical and current governance were also placed above the lower-story colonnade and 22nd-floor false colonnade. The shields represent the historical colony of New Amsterdam and the Province of New York, as well as the present-day county, city, and state of New York (the county of New York being coextensive with the borough of Manhattan). The shields on the lower colonnade correspond with the tops of the columns. On the facade itself, the second-story windows are flanked by six pairs of figures in relief, representing the building's original occupants.

=== Features ===
==== Base ====
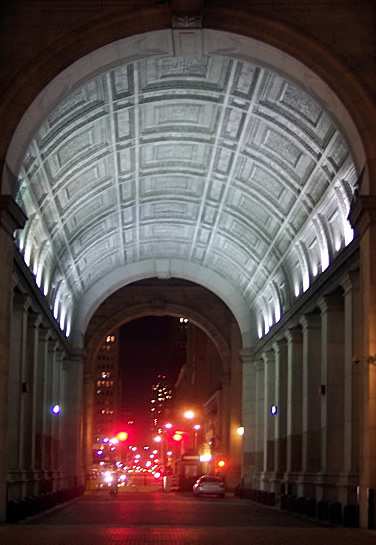
The central arched vault, inspired by the Roman Arch of Constantine

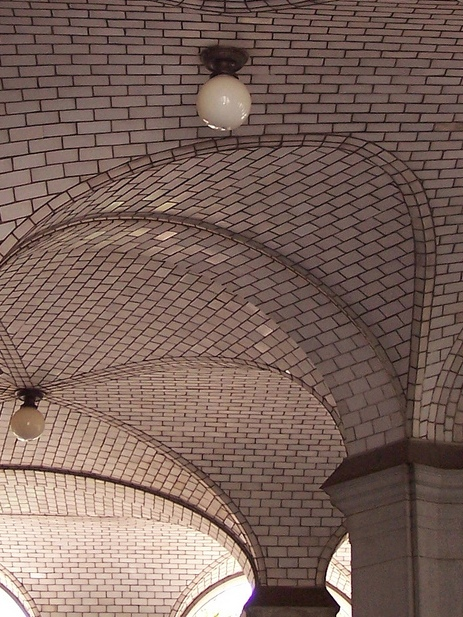
Guastavino ceiling tiles on the south arcade

A large, arched vaulted corridor is located at the center of the building's base, at the eastern end of Chambers Street, and is flanked by two smaller arched vaults. The arch measures about 50 feet (15 m) tall and 35 feet (11 m) wide. It is designed in the neoclassical style like the Arch of Constantine. The vault was large enough to accommodate New Chambers Street, which was closed in 1971 to make way for a pedestrian plaza in front of One Police Plaza and the Manhattan Municipal Building. The terracotta vault was modeled on the entrance of the Palazzo Farnese in Rome, and was also called the "Gate of the City" after William Jean Beauley painted an image of the scene. The vault separates the lobby into two sections, each with its own set of elevator banks. The second through fifth stories are also divided into two portions by the vault. When the Municipal Building opened, the vault created a wind tunnel effect, leading employees to nickname it the "Cave of the Winds".

As constructed, the first floor was devoted entirely to public space, with two open loggias and the two portions of the lobby. Underneath each loggia were two massive staircases leading to the mezzanine of the Chambers Street station. The staircase under the south loggia measured 64 feet (20 m) wide and could accommodate 1,280 passengers per minute, while that under the north loggia was 43 feet (13 m) wide and could accommodate 800 passengers per minute. The loggia under the southern wing still exists, with staircases leading to the subway from both the north and south. It is supported by a set of columns and has a ceiling of white Guastavino tiles. The loggia under the northern wing is no longer extant, having been enclosed.

The Chambers Street subway station, served by the J and Z trains, consists of two levels below the building: the mezzanine and the platform level. The mezzanine connects with the Brooklyn Bridge–City Hall station, which is served by the 4, 5, 6, and <6> trains. The station opened in 1913 and was intended as the Brooklyn Rapid Transit Company's main subway terminal in Manhattan, but fell into disrepair after businesses moved uptown in the 1930s. When the Municipal Building was completed, there were also supposed to be new station buildings for the adjacent elevated IRT and BRT stations, designed in the same architectural style. The tracks from the Chambers Street station would have also connected directly to the elevated tracks on the Brooklyn Bridge, but the connection was never opened.

==== Structural features ====
While the layer of bedrock under the Municipal Building was quite close to the surface underneath the southern part of the building, the bedrock dropped to a depth of about 180 feet (55 m) under the northern portion of the site, where it would be extremely difficult to dig caissons. (Note: Landau and Condit cite the bedrock depth as ranging between 136 and 178 feet (41 and 54 m). In a footnote, they cite a late-20th century publication as saying that the bedrock was 209 feet (64 m) deep at the north end and 290 feet (88 m) deep outside the lot. However, Landau and Condit say that contemporary publications, which extensively described the foundations' engineering, give a maximum depth of 178 feet (54 m).) A layer of sand was present to a depth of 130 feet (40 m), while the average depth of the bedrock under the building was about 144 feet (44 m). The contract for the foundations was the largest to be awarded for a single building in the United States, with 140,000 cubic yards (110,000 m^{3}) being excavated at a cost of $1.5 million. The foundations incorporated 50,000 cubic yards (38,000 m^{3}) of concrete for the piers, as well as 70,000 barrels of cement.

The foundations also include 106 caissons; the southern two-thirds of the site contain 68 caissons extend to the bedrock, while the northern third contains 38 caissons that only extend to the quicksand. The caissons range in size from 6.5 feet (2.0 m) in diameter to 26 by 31 feet (7.9 by 9.4 m) across, extending to an average depth of 130 feet (40 m). The maximum depth of the caissons was 145 feet (44 m) below grade; for the northern part of the site, the Foundation Company built larger caissons resting on sand at a depth of 74 feet (23 m). While the caissons under the southern two-thirds of the building carry 15 short tons per square foot (150 t/m^{2}), the larger caissons under the northern third of the building carry only 6 short tons per square foot (59 t/m^{2}). Each caisson was positioned so that the columns above did not interfere with the subway station.

The Municipal Building's frame had 26,000 short tons (23,000 long tons; 24,000 t) of steel, which required 20 derricks to erect. The superstructure weighed a total of 180,000 short tons (160,000 long tons; 160,000 t). The above-ground walls, and half of the beams in the superstructure, were carried by steel-plate girders at the first floor, spanning the subway station. The girders were connected to other steel beams, which distributed the building's entire weight to the caissons. Each of the first-floor girders were about 10 feet (3.0 m) deep and grouped in sets of two or three. The Municipal Building's largest girders, supporting the Chambers Street arch, were 36 feet (11 m) long and up to 11 feet (3.4 m) deep; these girders weighed as much as 50 short tons (45 long tons; 45 t). Above the girders and caissons are 167 columns that rise through the upper stories. The largest column in the superstructure measured 34 feet (10 m) long and weighed 34 short tons (30 long tons; 31 t).

==== Interior ====
Except for the fourth story, all of the upper floors were devoted to offices. The elevator banks and stairs were on the eastern side of the building, while the offices were concentrated along the western side and on the north and south wings. There were four staircase shafts that extended the height of the building. In addition, 33 elevators were provided in the initial construction, though this number was later expanded to 37. Of the original elevators, 32 were accessible from the lobby; they were grouped in two banks of 16 cabs each. Most of the elevators from the lobby traveled only to the 25th story, where a separate elevator connected the 25th through 37th floors. During the 1934 elevator replacements, eight of the elevator shafts were shortened to make way for office space.

Because the basement is mostly taken up by the subway station, most of the mechanical equipment is located on the fourth floor. As such, the fourth floor has a much lower ceiling than the other stories. The basement contains some space for boilers, while the elevators are controlled by a dispatching room on the 26th floor. There are also four emergency-exit staircases.

Each story was constructed with either 27,000 square feet (2,500 m^{2}) or 31,000 square feet (2,900 m^{2}) of rentable office space. The materials in the Municipal Building included 400,000 square feet (37,000 m^{2}) of hollow-tile partitions, 500,000 square feet (46,000 m^{2}) of cement flooring, 60,000 square feet (5,600 m^{2}) of asphalt flooring in the vaults, 340,000 square feet (32,000 m^{2}) of plastering, and 160,000 square feet (15,000 m^{2}) of Yule marble. Other types of marble, such as Tennessee marble, were used for decorative elements such as the baseboards of the rooms. Steel was painted to resemble wood, while wooden elements were only used for door and window frames. Most of the floors are made of cement, but the fifth floor, originally used for public hearings and the municipal reference library, had 34,000 square feet (3,200 m^{2}) of cork flooring to reduce noise. In later years, the hallways and offices were re-clad in plasterboard and sectioned into small cubicles, but the building retained such elements as its ornate marble bathrooms.

== History ==
=== Previous plans ===
By the late 19th century, New York City governmental functions had outgrown New York City Hall. At the time, the city government's agencies rented space in various buildings from Downtown Manhattan up to Midtown Manhattan, with the number of such arrangements increasing by the year. In the 1884 annual report of the City of New York, mayor Franklin Edson declared that more space was urgently needed for governmental functions. He also noted that City Hall's "style of architecture was such that without marring its present symmetry, it couldn't be enlarged to the required extent." Edson suggested buying 280 Broadway, at the corner with Chambers Street, for use by the city government.

The government, desiring to cut down the amount of rent paid to private landlords, ultimately held four design competitions for a new, massive building that would be suitable to house many agencies under one roof. As early as 1885, a commission was empowered to look for plots of land where such a structure could be built, and by 1887, authorities were considering erecting a structure adjacent to City Hall itself, in City Hall Park. Mayor Abram Hewitt appointed a commission to study suitable plans and plots of land in 1888, although Hewitt opposed putting such a building anywhere except City Hall Park. The commissioners of the Sinking Fund initially approved a municipal building east of the Tweed Courthouse, at the park's northeastern corner. An architectural design competition was commenced for this new building, and seven architects submitted plans. Charles B. Atwood's winning proposal called for a pair of seven-story pavilions flanking City Hall. The public generally opposed the idea of development in the park, and the plan was voted down by the New York State Senate in February 1890.

The law authorizing the new building was modified in 1890 so that the new structure would be able to house other city agencies as well. Mayor Hugh J. Grant proposed a large municipal office building in early 1890, and that July, a committee of the city government was created to look for alternate sites. The committee published a report in October 1890, outlining three possible sites on Chambers Street. The first option was southwest of Chambers Street and Broadway; the second, northwest of Chambers and Centre Streets; and the third, northeast of Chambers and Centre Streets (at the current building's location). (Note: The sites were: A block to the northwest of City Hall, bounded by Warren Street to the south, Broadway to the east, Chambers Street to the north, and Church Street to the west. This would provide 51,600-square-foot (4,790 m^{2}) of floor area.; A lot to the northeast of City Hall, bounded by Chambers Street to the south, Centre Street to the east, Duane Street to the north, and 49 Chambers to the west. This would provide 49,000-square-foot (4,600 m^{2}) of floor area.; A block to the northeast of City Hall, bounded by Chambers Street to the south, Centre Street to the west, and Duane Street to the northeast (the northern part of the current building's site). This would provide 55,000-square-foot (5,100 m^{2}) of floor area.) The committee recommended the third option, which would be the cheapest and offer the most floor area, as well as provide an opportunity for redevelopment at that location. However, the city government decided in March 1893 that the municipal building would instead replace City Hall, with two wings extending north to flank the Tweed Courthouse, despite the committee's recommendation and public objections to a City Hall site. The committee ultimately received 134 plans for such a new building, with six of these being selected as finalists. In response to opposition to City Hall's demolition, the New York governor signed a law in 1894 that once again prohibited the municipal building's construction. The six finalist submissions were supposed to receive monetary prizes, (Note: John Rochester Thomas, one of the finalists, was selected as the first-place contender in February 1896. He would be commissioned to design the Hall of Records on the committee's second-option site, at the northwest corner of Chambers and Centre Streets.) but ran into difficulty even collecting their awards, since the city had never formally accepted the committee's report on the finalists.

In 1899, architect George B. Post proposed a municipal office tower to be built at the northeast corner of Chambers and Centre Streets, while preserving City Hall, as part of a greater plan to rearrange Lower Manhattan's streets. The next March, state senator Patrick H. McCarren proposed a bill that would construct the municipal building on the blocks bounded by Broadway and Reade, Centre, and Chambers Streets, north of the Tweed Courthouse and west of the current building's site. The structure would replace 280 Broadway and the old Emigrant Industrial Savings Bank Building, incorporate the then-under-construction Hall of Records, and would also entail destroying the Tweed Courthouse. Several architects submitted proposals, the most elaborate of which was by McKim, Mead & White. Additionally, in 1903, the city's bridge commissioner Gustav Lindenthal hired George Post and Henry Hornbostel as architects for a planned trolley hub at the foot of the Brooklyn Bridge, just east of City Hall. This plan also involved constructing a 45-story municipal office tower with a campanile at Chambers and Centre Streets. The site would have cost $6.7 million. The municipal building and trolley hub plans were deferred by the administration of mayor Seth Low when he left office at the end of 1903.

=== Planning and construction ===
==== Architectural design competition ====
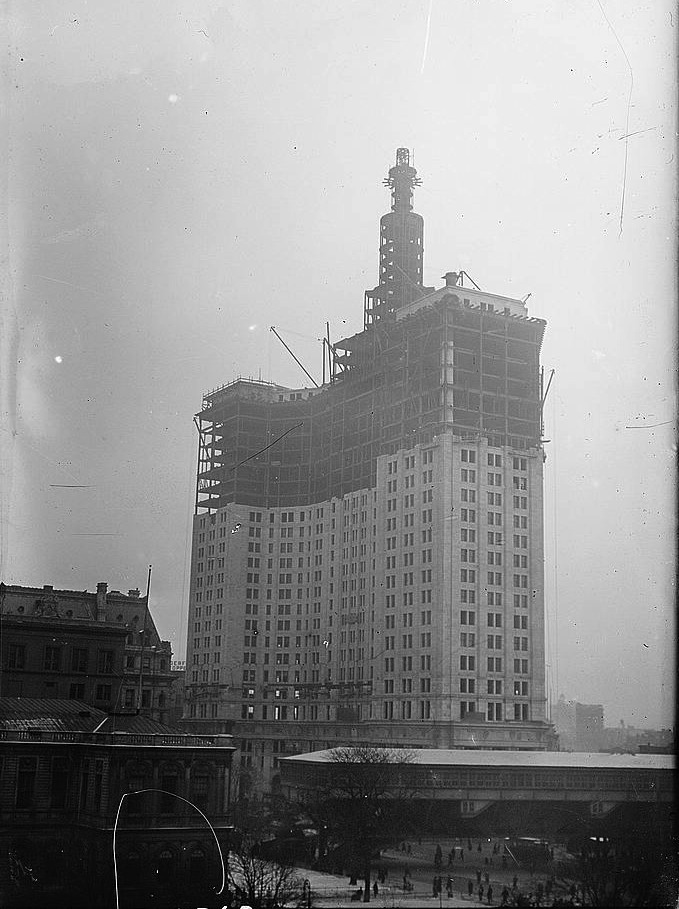
Under construction, c. 1912

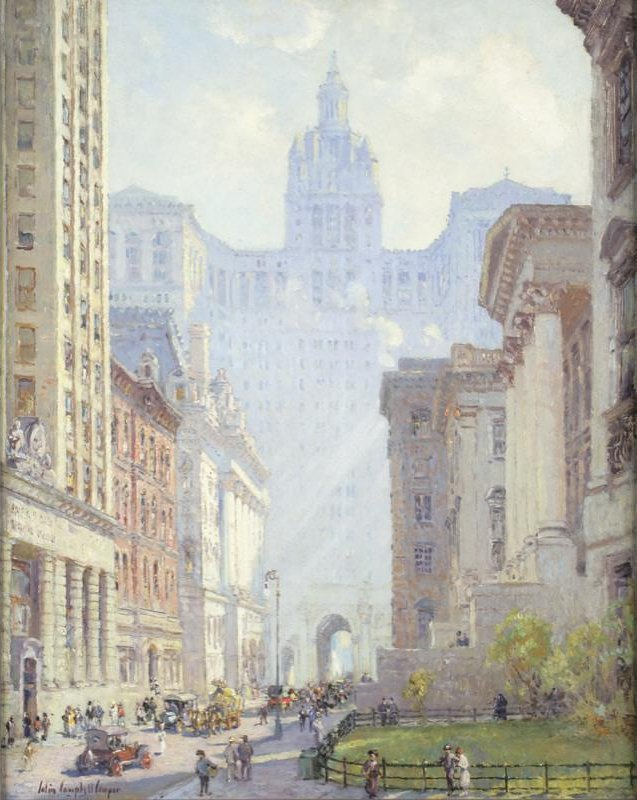
Chambers Street and the Municipal Building by Colin Campbell Cooper, c. 1922

By early 1907, the Hall of Records had been completed, but there was still not enough space for the city's important files; further, the city was paying large amounts for rent in private buildings. Officials pointed out that the cramped quarters of the city government's departments posed a fire hazard, and legislation had been proposed for a new municipal building. In July 1907, Lindenthal—who had already secured a new plot of land for the Brooklyn Bridge trolley hub—was authorized by the state legislature to host a fourth and final design competition for the municipal building. The Brooklyn loop line, a four-track subway line, was planned to be built under the site as well, passing through a large five-platform station at Chambers Street.

Twelve or thirteen architects were invited to compete. They would in turn elect a jury of three architects, whose names would not be published in advance. The Commissioner of Bridges would make a final decision based on the jury's recommendation. The building had to be at least 20 stories; the superstructure could not block train tracks, stairways, or platforms; the route of Chambers Street under the building had to be preserved; and the first floor, to be used for transit and building entrances, had to be completely covered, with a ceiling of at least 20 feet (6.1 m). The commissioner also recommended that the first story of each level be at ground level, and that an above-ground level be provided for mechanical equipment and building systems. The contestants were otherwise given "considerable freedom" for the building's design. By December 1907, several architects had submitted plans. Twelve architectural firms ultimately entered the competition, while Cass Gilbert withdrew.

The jury selected McKim, Mead & White's proposal in April 1908. The firm's design provided the most space for the city government, and it was similar in style to other municipal buildings of the time. The proposal included offices facing outward on all sides, a colonnade, a monument at the top, and a subway station in the basement. The winning design was less elaborate than some of the other submissions. such as the runner-up proposal by Howells & Stokes, inspired by 90 West Street. McKim, Mead & White had entered the contest under the encouragement of mayor George B. McClellan Jr. The firm's senior partners had been noncommittal about participating in the competition, though they named junior partner William Mitchell Kendall as the principal architect of the submission.

Originally, the building was to have risen 448 feet (137 m), with 23 stories. The firm revised its plans in 1908, adding two stories and lengthening the spire so the building stood 559 feet (170 m). The modified plans were submitted to the New York City Department of Buildings in October 1908. The city had initially intended to erect the Manhattan Municipal Building on a plot immediately to the south of the current site, bounded by Park Row, the Brooklyn Bridge, and North William Street. The final plan called for the building to be located between Park Row, Centre Street, and Duane Street, with Chambers Street running under the Municipal Building's center. The city government planned to occupy 11 of the building's 23 stories.

==== Construction ====
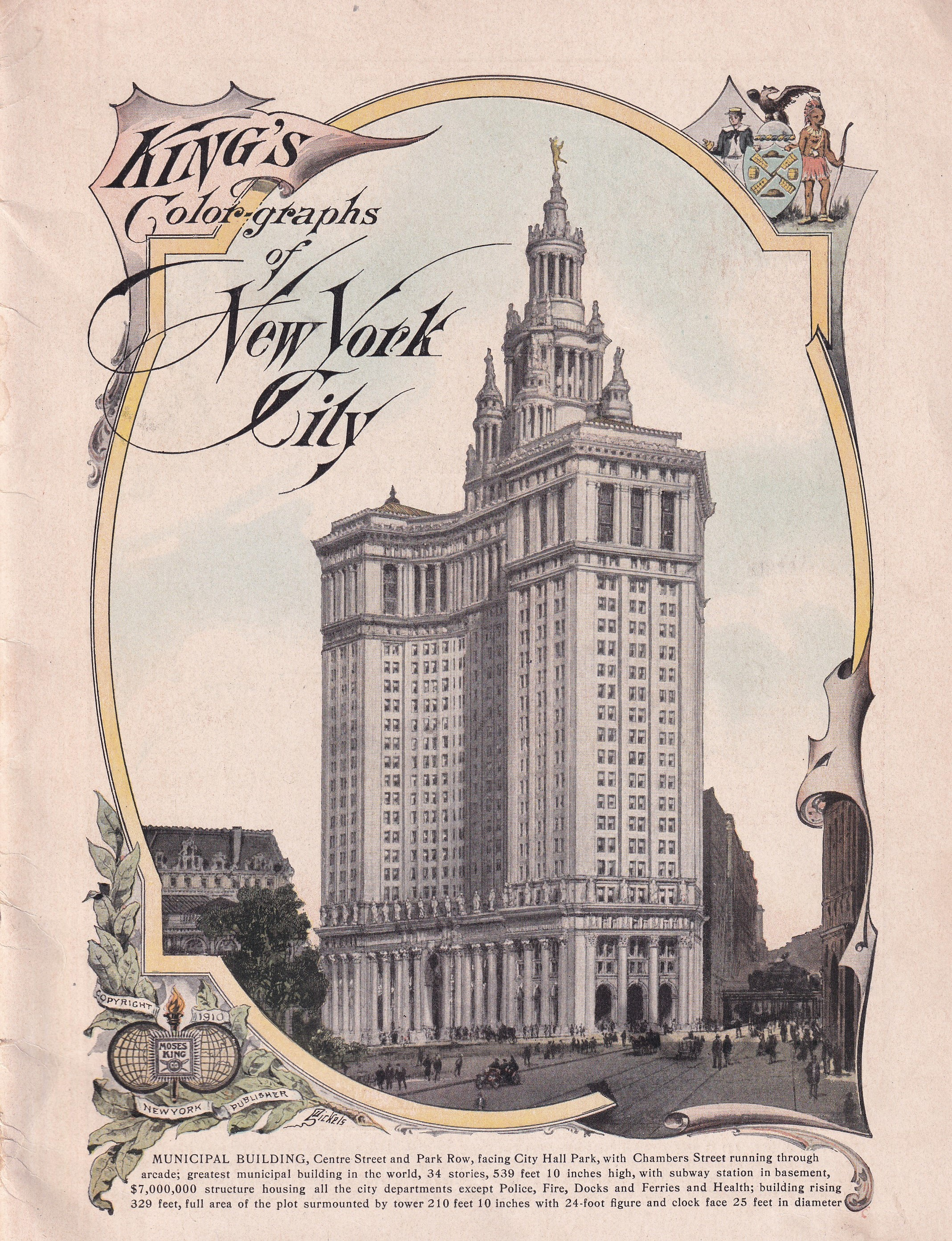
A depiction of the building in 1910, prior to its completion

By late 1908, the site was being cleared. Bids for foundation work were opened in December 1908, and the contract was awarded to the J. H. Gray Company. The original building plans were rejected by the city's buildings superintendent the same month because he felt that the underlying layer of soil and sand was not strong enough to carry the building. The architects did not want to spend another $300,000 just so the foundation would extend down to the bedrock. This resulted in delays in the construction of the proposed Brooklyn loop line under the building. Ultimately, the Foundation Company was contracted to dig the foundation with caissons under a very high air pressure of 47 pounds per square inch (320 kPa). Work was done in 20 shifts of five men working for forty minutes each day; only two workers developed decompression sickness and neither of them died. In a January 1909 speech, McClellan praised the project as "one of the most important projects the City has ever undertaken". At the time, he predicted that the building would cost $8 million.

Work on the Municipal Building officially started on July 17, 1909. One observer predicted that the building's construction would result in an increase in real-estate values, similar to what the Flatiron Building had done for the Flatiron District. Foundation work was completed in October 1909, when the New York City Art Commission approved the plans. The Board of Estimate approved a revised building plan that November. Bids for the construction of the superstructure were opened on December 21, but an injunction against the awarding of the contract was placed less than an hour after the bidding process started, after a lawsuit was filed over the fireproofing material that was supposed to be used in the building. Furthermore, the presence of the sand supposedly posed issues for the superstructure, though McClellan said that he believed it was safe to build on sand. McClellan laid the building's 4-short-ton (3.6-long-ton; 3.6 t) cornerstone on December 28; unlike at other municipal projects, the ceremony was private, and the cornerstone only had the year "1907" inscribed in Roman numerals. The injunction was reversed when the cornerstone was laid.

The Pennsylvania Steel Company was contracted in early 1910 to manufacture 25,000 short tons (22,000 long tons; 23,000 t) of structural steel for the Municipal Building. Construction was interrupted by various incidents. Three workers were buried in June 1910 when temporary bracing in the foundation collapsed, though all survived; another cave-in occurred on Park Row in September 1910. A fire broke out on the 25th floor in 1911, which at the time was the highest fire the New York City Fire Department had fought. Steel frame construction took place between June 1910 and July 1911, followed by the installation of exterior walls between March 1911 and November 1912. There were delays in installing the granite facade because the original materials were found to be inferior. By 1913, the superstructure was topped out with the unveiling of Civic Pride at the top of the Municipal Building's tower.

=== Use ===
==== 1910s and 1920s ====
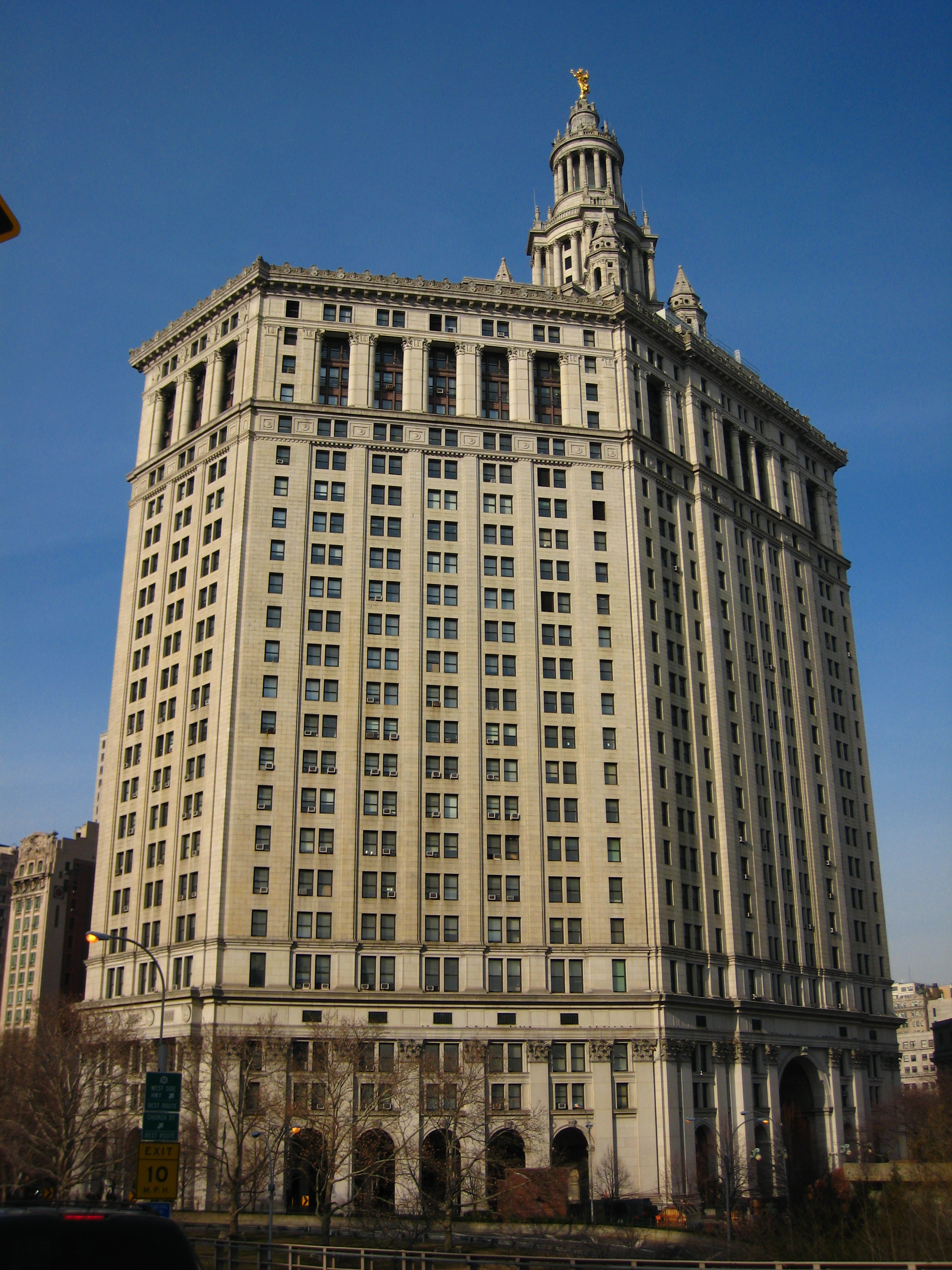
Rear view, from the Brooklyn Bridge

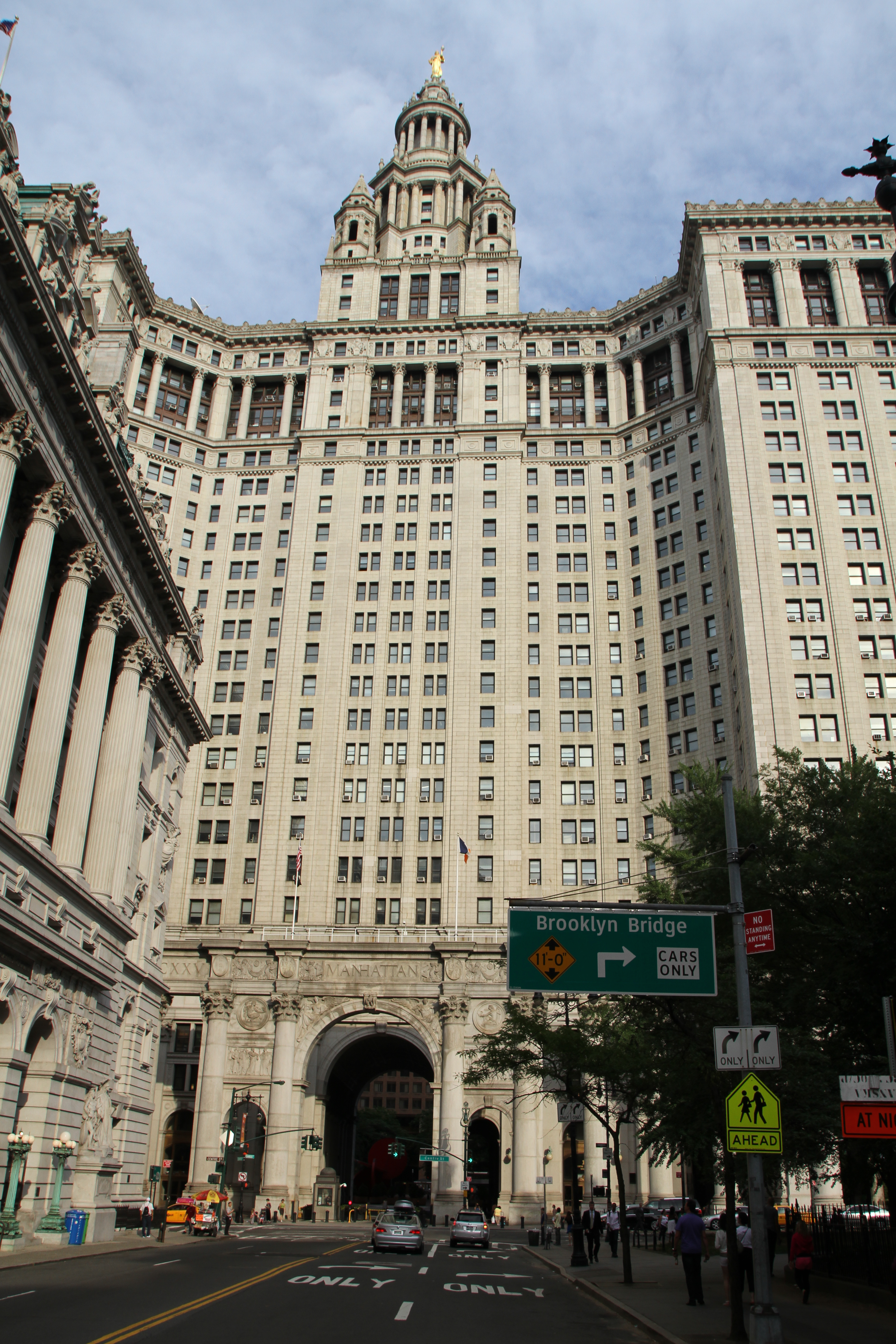
From Chambers Street

The first sections of the Municipal Building were occupied in mid-1913. The building had not been ready at the beginning of the year, forcing some city departments to renew the leases at their existing quarters. The interiors were not finished until 1916. The building had cost $12 million (equivalent to $284,515,000 in 2025), which was not repaid with interest until 1964; the interest was more than twice the original cost. The land alone had cost $6 million. Nevertheless, the structure was expected to save the city from paying $800,000 a year in rent. Upon opening, the Municipal Building housed 4,200 city employees. It was patrolled by a private police force, which monitored the building 24 hours a day, as well as a cleaning crew of 135 people. There were also telephone switchboards for inter-departmental communication, which at the time of completion were described as state-of-the-art. When the building opened, it employed 500 women and 3,700 men.

The structure was supposed to house most city agencies except the Police, Health, and Parks departments, the Aqueduct Commission, and courts. The Parks Department moved to the Municipal Building shortly after the structure was completed; by 1916, the building also had a court that only heard cases in which the city government was involved. Mayor John Purroy Mitchel, after taking office in 1914, criticized the usage of space in the Municipal Building as "wasteful". Some of the city departments that were scheduled to move into the building had found space elsewhere, and other city departments had been allotted less space in the building than in their previous quarters; as such, only 28 percent of the space was originally occupied. By 1915, the building was fully occupied. The New York City Board of Estimate commenced an investigation into office vacancies at the Municipal Building in 1916 after the New York Public Service Commission leased floors in other buildings. The layouts of the interiors were also criticized, even though the city had selected the design specifically of its interior layout.

A nonprofit organization established a cafeteria on the 26th floor in 1918; although the city provided no subsidies to the cafeteria, the cafeteria also did not have to pay rent. Radio station WNYC (AM) started broadcasting from the 24th floor in 1924, remaining there for 85 years, and a small hospital was established on the third floor in 1929. The Municipal Building's size notwithstanding, various entities had proposed to build an even larger municipal skyscraper to the west by the 1930s, but with no success.

==== 1930s to 1960s ====
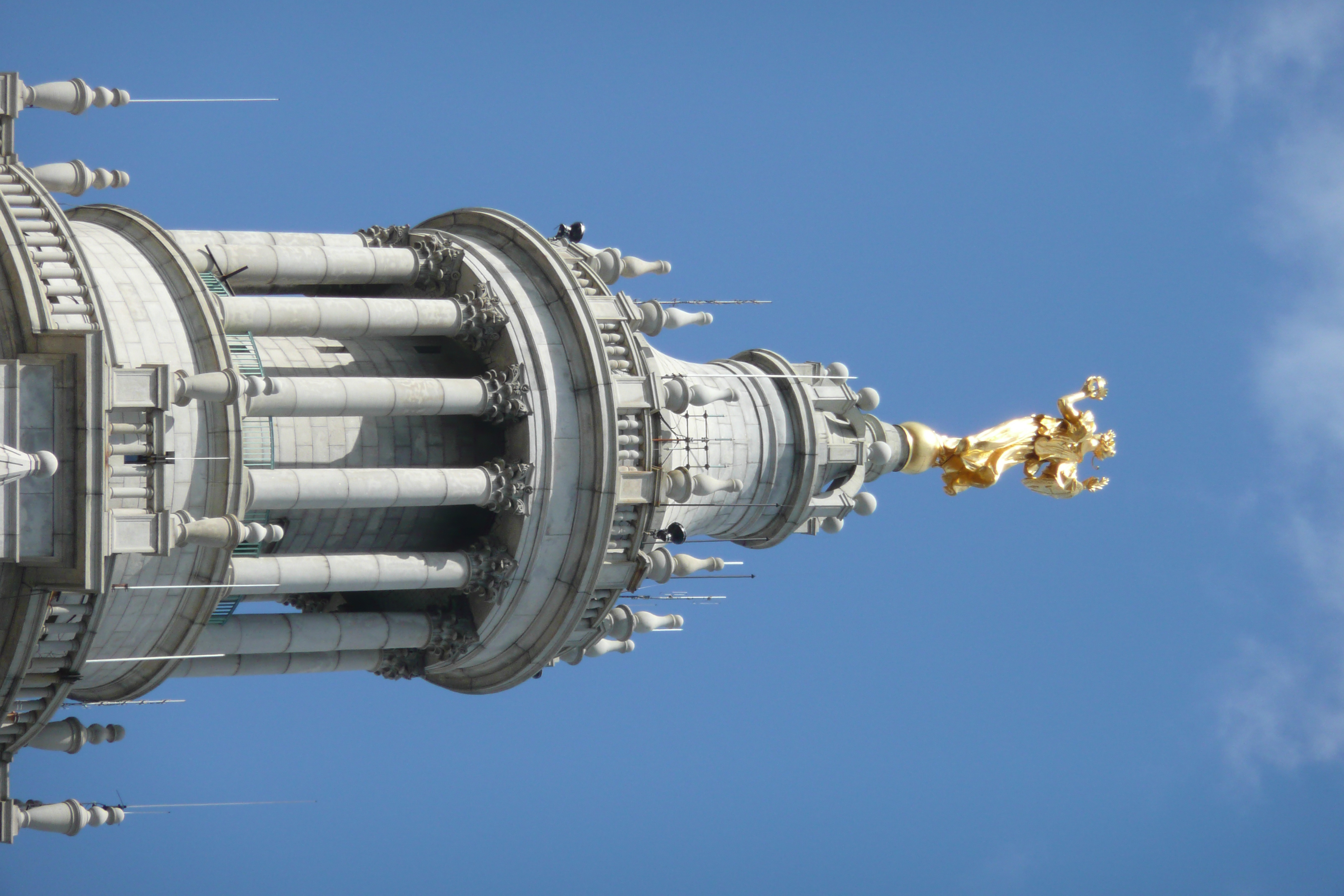
Cupola detail

By 1931, Manhattan borough president Samuel Levy had requested $2 million to replace the building's elevators, which were so unreliable that some employees used the emergency stairs instead of the elevators. All of the elevators needed twice-daily inspections, and, since their manufacturer was no longer in business, the city had to make its own replacement parts for the elevators, which were described as "old and wheezy", and acting like "Coney Island roller coasters". After fourteen of the elevators were taken out of service in late 1934, architect Mitchell Bernstein filed plans in January 1935 for a $160,000 renovation of the building's elevators and offices. Work began that June and was funded partially with a $1.8 million grant from the Works Progress Administration. While the elevators were being replaced, city employees worked in three staggered shifts. Some of the shafts above the 14th floor were removed to make way for office space. The first group of seven new elevators was installed in April 1936, and the elevator-replacement project was completed at the end of 1937.

The city government conducted other renovations during the 1930s, cleaning the facade for the first time in 1936. Civic Fame at the top of the Municipal Building was refurbished during the 1930s, and green mercury vapor bulbs were installed in the north lobby. Several Civil Works Administration artists also created paintings for some of the offices. A bronze plaque, memorializing 316 firefighters who died on duty, was dedicated at the building in 1937. The city also planned to add three stories atop the building for $2.037 million; to fund this project, it received a $916,650 grant from the Public Works Administration in 1938. By the next year, the building could no longer accommodate all of the city government's agencies, several of which were located in alternate quarters surrounding Foley Square to the north. The offices in the Municipal Building included radio station WNYC on the 25th floor, the Municipal Reference Library on the 22nd floor, and the Marriage Chapel on the 2nd floor.

In 1949, the city's commissioner of public works announced that four floors would be renovated and modernized in the first phase of a planned multi-stage overhaul. The next year, the city began installing a dial-telephone system at the Municipal Building, replacing the fourteen old telephone switchboards. At the time, the 20 city agencies in the building had a collective 1,264 telephones. The new switchboards were activated in 1951, and every line in the Municipal Building was given the same 10-digit phone number with 1,426 four-digit extensions; the number was changed in 1963 when the city government consolidated about 7,000 phone extensions in Lower Manhattan. The New York City Landmarks Preservation Commission designated the building as an official city landmark in 1966, and the facade was again cleaned the next year for $400,000.

==== 1970s to present ====
The Municipal Building was listed on the National Register of Historic Places in 1972. The section of Chambers Street under the building was closed to vehicular traffic around the same time, with the construction of One Police Plaza. In 1974, Wank Adams Slavin was hired to undertake a $24 million renovation of the building's interior. As part of the renovation, corridors were to be narrowed, and partitions between offices would be removed, to create more office space; vinyl floor tiles and recessed lighting were to be installed; and the outdated plumbing system was to be replaced. The project was to increase the building's capacity to 6,500 employees. During this time, Civic Fame was also renovated. The building had been cleaned by 1975 at a cost of $300,000; although the interior had not been renovated yet, more funds for the project had also been appropriated. The building still had 5,000 employees by the late 1970s, but Newsday wrote that the building had "peeling walls, musty windows and old filing cabinets". Because the air conditioning rarely worked, many employees typically left the building an hour early during the summer.

A piece of granite fell from the Municipal Building in 1987, landing on a ramp on the Brooklyn Bridge, although no one was injured. A subsequent investigation found other loose rocks on the facade, and netting was placed on the facade as a result. In 1988, workers surrounded the building with scaffolding in preparation for the first large-scale restoration of the facade, which was to begin the next year. The renovation was expected to cost $58 million and required 39 miles (63 km) of steel tubes to support the massive scaffolds. By then, the building housed 6,000 employees and contained 11 percent of all the office space owned by the city government. The Municipal Building had become so overcrowded that several agencies, like the Department of Buildings, had been forced to relocate. The facade restoration was undertaken by the architects Wank Adams Slavin. Another restoration of Civic Fame took place during this time, for which Wank Adams Slavin received a preservation award from the city government. The 23rd and 24th stories were renovated in the early 1990s.

The building was renamed after David N. Dinkins, New York City's first African-American mayor, upon his 88th birthday in October 2015. As part of the "Halls of the City" program, in early 2026, the New York City government began renting out the Municipal Building's archway and several other properties for events. Mayor Zohran Mamdani also announced that free tours of the building's cupola would begin later that year; the cupola had previously never opened to the public.

== Agencies ==
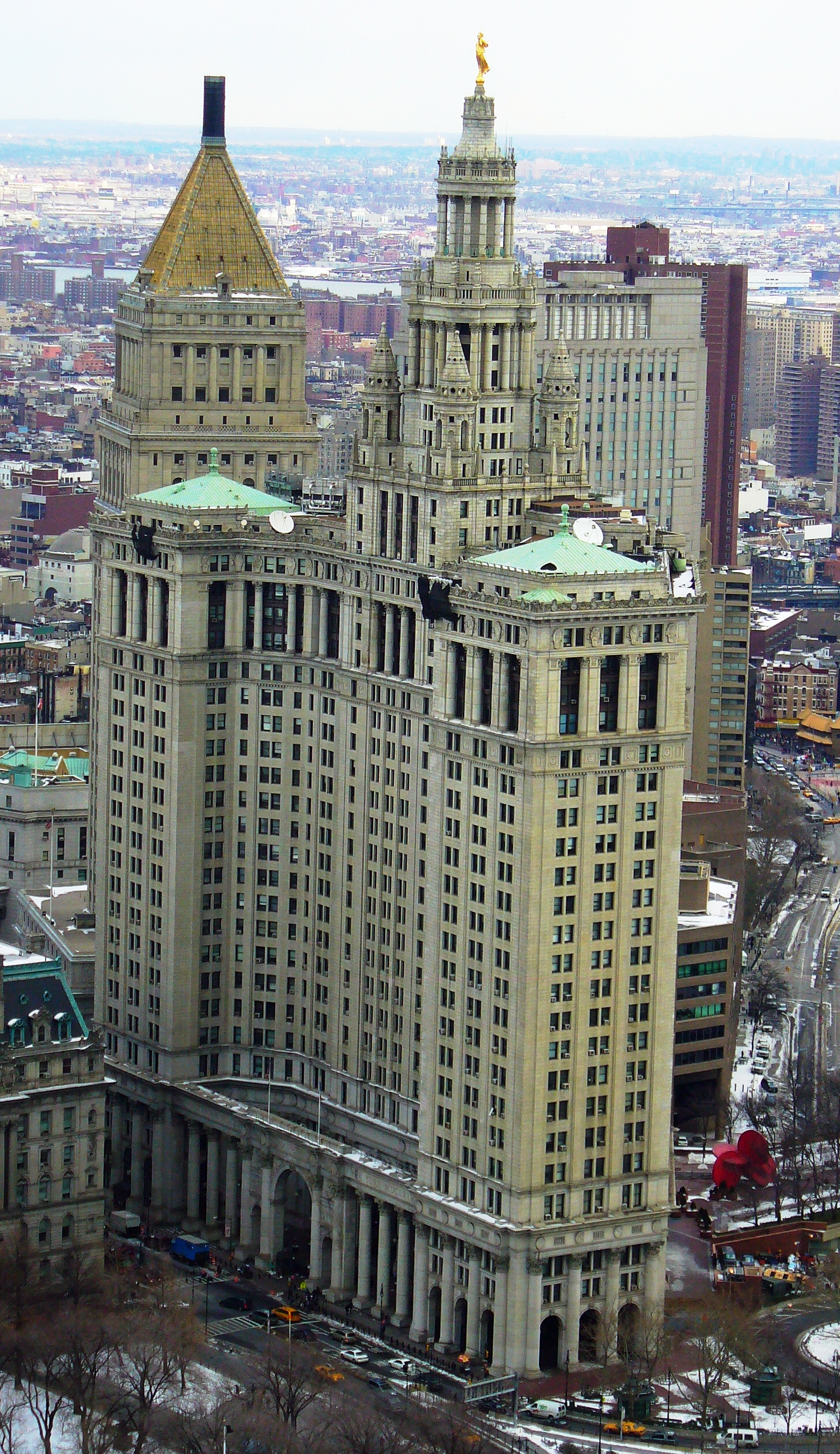
A view of the building from above with Thurgood Marshall United States Courthouse in the background

The following New York City public offices are located in the Manhattan Municipal Building:

- New York City Department of Citywide Administrative Services
- New York City Department of Finance
- New York Public Service Commission
- Manhattan Borough President
- New York City Public Advocate
- New York City Comptroller
- New York City Landmarks Preservation Commission
- New York City Office of Payroll Administration
- New York City Tax Commission
- New York City Department of Veterans' Services
- Field offices of the Office of the Mayor, New York City Department of Information Technology and Telecommunications (DoITT), New York City Department of Buildings, New York State Office of the Inspector General, and New York City Department of Environmental Protection.

The Office of the City Clerk was formerly housed in the Municipal Building; about 16,000 weddings were performed annually at the former Manhattan Marriage Bureau in the Municipal Building, in civil ceremonies lasting about four minutes. The City Clerk's Office relocated to nearby 141 Worth Street in 2009.

== Incidents ==
Numerous accidents have occurred at the Municipal Building. In 1921, an elevator overturned, killing its two occupants. A pile of coal stored in bunkers underneath the building caught fire in 1942, and a 2005 fire slightly injured six firefighters. Additionally, a flood on the fourth floor in 1959 destroyed brand-new machinery that processed the pay checks for the building's workers.

== Impact ==
=== Critical reception and influence ===
Lionel Moses, appraising McKim, Mead & White's work in 1922, said that "we have a building of 580 feet to the top of the figure, of superbly monumental character and classic beauty, every part of which attests the architectural knowledge of its designers". In particular, Moses praised the fact that the firm could create a large office building on "a comparatively small plot of irregular shape", which could still accommodate a subway station, a public street, and mechanical equipment. The 1939 WPA Guide to New York City stated that the facade "gains dignity through the bold treatment of the intermediate stories, despite the poorly related tower and the disturbing character of the Corinthian colonnade at the base". In their 2004 book New York Artwalks, Marina Harrison and Lucy D. Rosenfeld described the Civic Fame statue as "a graceful and unusually charming sculpture in the allegorical style of municipal-building decorations".

The building was also noted for its symbolism. A reporter for Newsday wrote in 1987: "It is the city not just as a metaphor—although it is certainly that, from Civic Fame (the name of the statue at the very top) right down to the stressful rumble underneath (six subway tracks where the basement would be). The Municipal Building is where the money is."

The Municipal Building was the first of several ornately designed civic office buildings, influencing other structures such as the Terminal Tower in Cleveland, the Fisher Building in Detroit, the Wrigley Building in Chicago, and the New York Central Building in Midtown Manhattan. In particular, the base of the Municipal Building above Chambers Street was likened to the base of the New York Central Building, which spanned Park Avenue. The base also inspired the General Motors Building in Detroit, while the tower stories influenced the "Tower of Jewels", designed by Carrère and Hastings for the Panama–Pacific International Exposition. The arches of the Moscow State University's main building and of 550 Madison Avenue in Midtown Manhattan were also inspired by that of the Municipal Building.

=== In popular culture ===
The Manhattan Municipal Building appears in several films, such as a key scene of the 1996 film One Fine Day, in which Jack Taylor (George Clooney) spots Manny Feldstein (Joe Grifasi) and chases him to the roof. In "Crocodile" Dundee (1986), muggers inside the Municipal Building entrance to the subway station pull a knife on the title character (Paul Hogan) and his girlfriend Sue (Linda Kozlowski). In Ghostbusters (1984), the team leaves to confront Gozer from the building. In The Professional (1994), antagonist Stansfield, played by the actor Gary Oldman, works for the Drug Enforcement Administration at the building, in office 4602. Newsday wrote in 1987 that the structure was often used for film shoots where characters jumped off the building's roof. Additionally, in the music video for the song "Not Afraid", the rapper Eminem is depicted standing on the edge of the building's roof in multiple shots.

== See also ==
- Early skyscrapers
- List of New York City borough halls and municipal buildings
- List of New York City Designated Landmarks in Manhattan below 14th Street
- National Register of Historic Places listings in Manhattan below 14th Street

Preceded by Hudson Terminal	Largest office building in the world by floor area 1913–1915	Succeeded by Equitable Building
