= Ted Weiss Federal Building =

Office skyscraper in Manhattan, New York

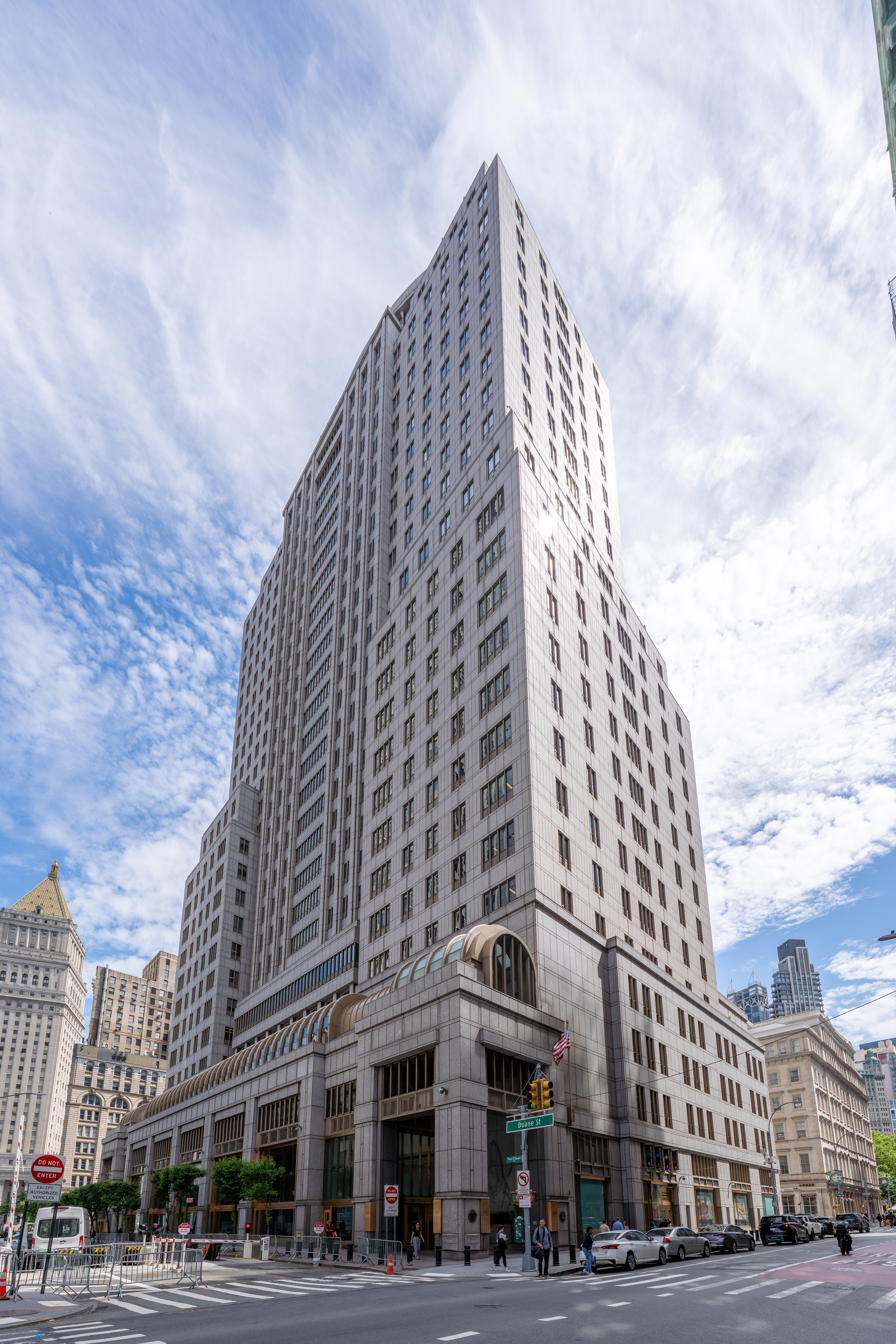
- Alternative names: Foley Square Federal Building

General information
- Location: 290 Broadway, Manhattan, New York, United States
- Coordinates: 40°42′53″N 74°00′19″W
- Current tenants: Internal Revenue Service, Environmental Protection Agency, Government Accountability Office
- Named for: Ted Weiss
- Construction started: 1991
- Completed: 1994
- Opened: 1995
- Cost: $292,000,000
- Owner: General Services Administration

Height
- Roof: 475 ft (145 m)

Technical details
- Floor count: 34
- Floor area: 939,689 sq ft (87,300.0 m^{2})

Design and construction
- Architect: Hellmuth Obata & Kassabaum
- Developer: Linpro New York Realty
- Main contractor: Tishman Construction

The Ted Weiss Federal Building, also known as the Foley Square Federal Building, is a 34-story United States federal building at 290 Broadway in the Civic Center neighborhood of Lower Manhattan in New York City. Opened in 1994, the building was developed by Linpro New York Realty and designed by Hellmuth Obata & Kassabaum (HOK), with Raquel Ramati Associates as the design consultant and Tishman Construction as the general contractor. The building is named for Ted Weiss (1927–1992), a U.S. representative from New York.

The building is divided into two parts: an office tower and a three-story special function facility. The base of the Weiss Federal Building contains a colonnade facing north toward Duane Street, as well as several works of art that relate to the adjacent African Burial Ground National Monument. The facade of the structure is enclosed with Deer Isle granite. The 3rd through 29th floors are typical office floors, which contain offices for the Internal Revenue Service, Environmental Protection Agency, and the Government Accountability Office. Additionally, the National Park Service manages a visitor center for the African Burial Ground National Monument at the base of the building.

In December 1987, the General Services Administration (GSA) was authorized to construct the Moynihan U.S. Courthouse and the Weiss Federal Building on two sites owned by the government of New York City. The GSA and the New York City government signed an agreement in March 1988, but the plans were delayed for several years. The GSA finally awarded $700 million in contracts for the two projects in March 1991, and construction began shortly afterward. After human remains were found at the site during an excavation in October 1991, the building's construction was temporarily halted, and a proposed four-story pavilion was eliminated from the plans. The building opened in 1994 as the Federal Office Building and was renamed for Weiss in 2003.

== Site ==
The Ted Weiss Federal Building is at 290 Broadway in the Civic Center neighborhood of Lower Manhattan in New York City. It occupies the western section of block 154, a city block bounded by Broadway to the west, Duane Street to the north, Elk Street to the east, and Reade Street to the south. The land lot is L-shaped, running along Broadway and Duane Street. Covering a total area of 43,569 square feet (4,047.7 m^{2}), the lot measures 178.52 feet (54 m) along Broadway and 400.5 feet (122 m) along Duane Street. The city block was formerly bisected by Manhattan and Republican alleys.

The sidewalks along the perimeter of the building are made of colored admixture concrete that aligns with the building module. Exterior landscaping consists of tree plantings along the curb line on Duane and Reade streets, with custom-designed tree grates.

Nearby buildings and locations include the Broadway–Chambers Building and 287 Broadway to the southwest; the Jacob K. Javits Federal Building to the north; the African Burial Ground National Monument to the east; the Surrogate's Courthouse to the southeast; and 49 Chambers and 280 Broadway to the south. The building is also located within two historic districts. It is part of the African Burial Ground and the Commons Historic District, which the New York City Landmarks Preservation Commission (LPC) designated as a city landmark district in 1993. The building is also part of the African Burial Ground Historic District, a National Historic Landmark District.

=== Previous uses ===
Prior to the settlement of New Amsterdam (now New York City) in the 17th century, the site was largely a ravine that drained into Collect Pond in the northeast. The surrounding area contains evidence of the interments of individuals, mostly of African descent. Interments may have begun as early as the 17th century. These corpses were part of a cemetery called the Negros Burial Ground, which operated until the 1790s. During the next two centuries, historians were aware of the burial ground's existence but had believed that the corpses were destroyed. The section of the Negros Burial Ground between Duane and Reade streets, east of Broadway, was initially lower than the surrounding ground. The land was raised by up to 25 feet (7.6 m), and subsequent buildings' foundations were relatively shallow, thus preserving this section of the cemetery.

Much of the block had been developed with wood-and-brick houses in the late 18th and early 19th centuries. These structures were gradually converted for commercial use in the 1820s and 1830s, and larger commercial buildings had been built on the site by the 1850s. The Broadway portion of the site had contained several 10- to 16-story buildings, which were built in the late 1890s and demolished in the 1960s and 1970s. The commercial buildings on Reade Street were also razed around 1970. All of the structures on Broadway and Reade Street had been demolished to make way for a large municipal building that was never built. Some of the commercial buildings on Duane Street remained until 1991, when they were demolished to make way for the current edifice.

== Architecture ==
The Ted Weiss Federal Building was designed by Hellmuth Obata & Kassabaum (HOK), with Raquel Ramati Associates as the design consultant. In addition, Tishman Construction was the general contractor. John T. Livingston of the Linpro Company developed the building for the General Services Administration (GSA). The Ted Weiss Federal Building is designed in a modernized Federal style with postmodern elements. It measures 34 stories tall and reaches 475 feet (145 m) above ground level.

=== Form and facade ===
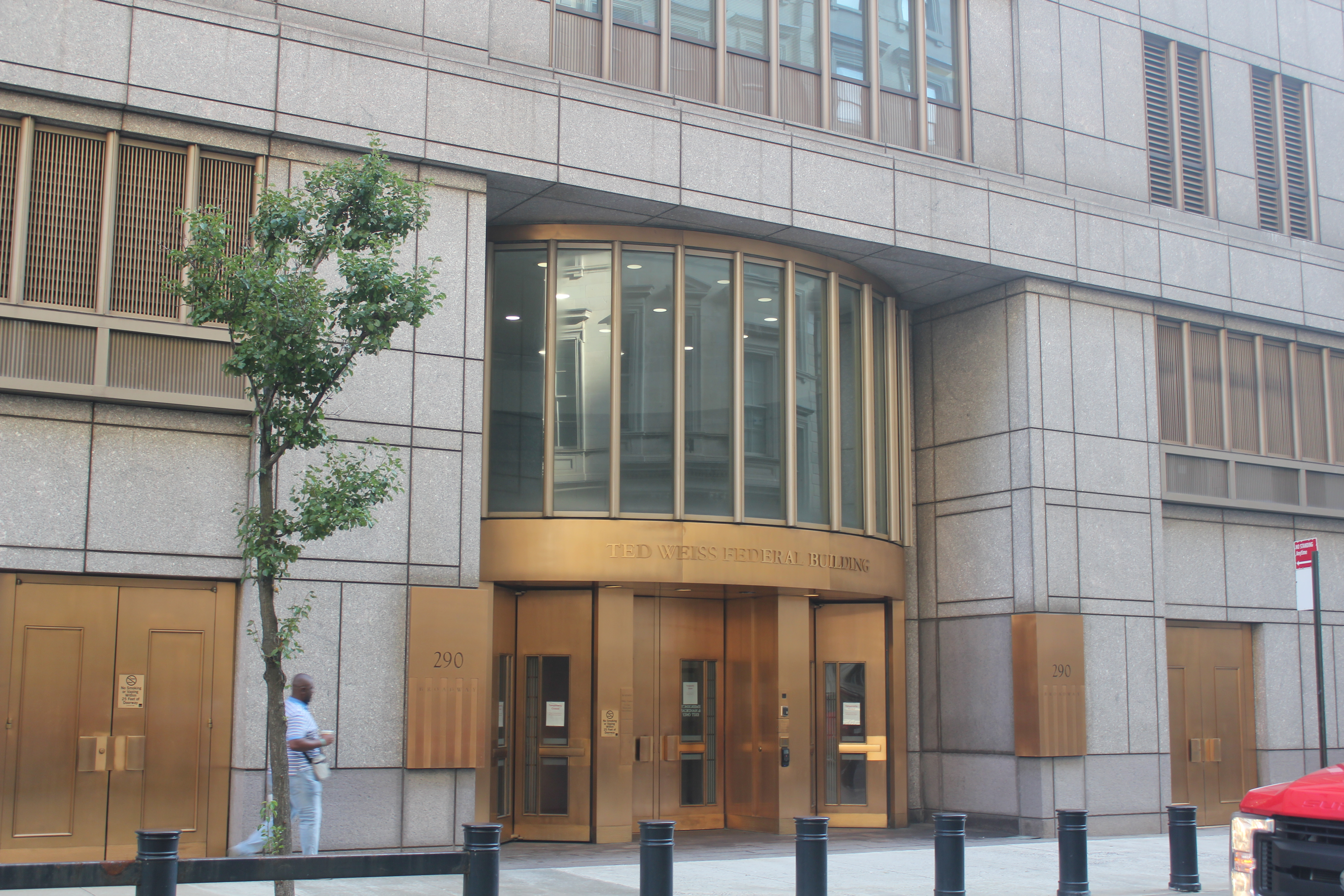
One of the building's entrances

The building is divided into two parts: an office tower and a three-story special function facility. The office building contains 30 office stories, two mechanical penthouse levels above grade, and two parking levels below grade.

The base of the Weiss Federal Building was planned with a four-story, 25-foot-wide (7.6 m) colonnade on Duane Street, facing north toward the Javits Federal Building. The design of the colonnade was simplified during the design process. Daniel Dolan of HOK, the primary architect, objected to the modification, saying that the simplified colonnade would resemble a "shopping mall skylight". The high-rise structure is enclosed with Deer Isle granite and a pre-fabricated, panelized, cladding system with punched aluminum windows. There is a curved colonnade on the facade below the roof. Above the roof is an open barrel-vaulted cage, placed atop a granite-sheathed, box-shaped penthouse housing the mechanical systems for the building.

=== Interior ===
As built, the building contains a double-height lobby covering 6,000 square feet (560 m^{2}). In addition, there is a 2,500-square-foot (230 m^{2}) restaurant with an attached 2,000-square-foot (190 m^{2}) dining terrace. The underground garage is variously cited as containing 163 or 260 parking spots. The structure contains 16 passenger elevators and two service elevators.

The mezzanine level of the office building includes a fitness center and central mechanical room. The mechanical room contains three chillers that each are capable of 1,300 tons of air conditioning (equivalent to 15,600,000 British thermal units per hour [4,600,000 W]). The 3rd through 29th floors are typical office floors complete with access flooring and nine foot ceilings. A conference center is located on the 30th floor with multi-story meeting and conference facilities.

=== Artwork ===
A rule for all new Federal buildings stipulated that 0.5 percent of the building's estimated construction cost be set aside for "Art-in-Architecture" projects. The building houses several works of art, many of which relate to the neighboring African Burial Ground National Monument.

An untitled mosaic by Roger Brown, next to the African Burial Ground's Outdoor Memorial, was installed on the facade in 1994. The work is a glass mosaic measuring 14 feet (4.3 m) high and 10 feet (3.0 m) wide. The top of the mosaic contains depictions of the Brooklyn Bridge, the World Trade Center's Twin Towers, and the Empire State Building. Below these structures is a grid of human faces, which become skulls toward the bottom of the mosaic. Brown painted the image on canvas, which Italian artisans then used to create glass mosaics. Also on the facade is Clyde Lynds's sculpture America Song, installed in 1995 just outside the building's entrance. America Song measures 32.5 feet (9.9 m) tall, 16 feet (4.9 m) wide, and 30 inches (760 mm) deep; it is made of cast concrete with fiber-optic cables that are illuminated at night. Sandblasted on stone below the sculpture is a poem by an anonymous African poet: "I want to be free/Want to be free,/Rainbow' round my shoulder/Wings on my feet". The GSA gave Lynds a design award for the artwork in 1997.

The building's lobby contains Africa Rising by Barbara Chase-Riboud, a bronze sculpture installed in 1998. The sculpture is themed to the struggles of slaves in the U.S. and measures 15 feet 5 inches (4.70 m) tall, 8 ft 6 in (2.59 m) wide, and 4 ft 4 in (1.32 m) deep. The lobby also contains Renewal, a silk-screened mural created in 1998 by Tomie Arai, which measures 7.5 by 38 feet (2.3 by 11.6 m) wide. It contains overlapping images relating to 18th- and early 19th-century American history, designed in a style that is intended to evoke the process of archeological excavation. The New Ring Shout, by the team of sculptor Houston Conwill, architect Joseph De Pace, and poet Estella Conwill Majozo, was installed in 1994 on the floor of the rotunda. This artwork, named after the historical ring shout dance, consists of a 40-foot-wide (12 m) terrazzo-and-polished brass circle with various patterns, symbols, texts, and languages.

== History ==
A 1,000-foot-tall (300 m) skyscraper for the eastern side of Broadway, between Duane and Reade streets, had been proposed in 1931 but was never built. By September 1987, the New York City government was planning to build a high-rise structure on the site, which was being used as a parking lot. The city government was contemplating developing the site for use by a private tenant or the United States federal government. To make way for such a development, the New York City Planning Commission was considering closing Manhattan and Republican alleys.

=== Planning ===
The GSA was authorized to construct two structures near Foley Square, Manhattan, as part of an omnibus spending bill signed by U.S. president Ronald Reagan in December 1987. The GSA would erect a courthouse (now the Moynihan U.S. Courthouse) east of the Thurgood Marshall United States Courthouse, as well as an office building five blocks away at 290 Broadway, south of the Jacob K. Javits Federal Building. The structures would have a combined 1.6 million square feet (150,000 m^{2}), providing space for overcrowded federal agencies in Lower Manhattan. Private developers would construct both buildings, and the GSA would lease the buildings for 30 years, after which it would take ownership. The United States Congress provided no funding for either development; instead, the developers would have to raise money on their own. The New York City government, which owned both sites, would lease 400,000 square feet (37,000 m^{2}) at 290 Broadway at a reduced rate in exchange for giving the land to the federal government.

The GSA and the New York City government signed an agreement in March 1988, allowing the development to proceed. In June 1988, the GSA issued a request for proposals (RFP), sending brochures with the project's specifications to over 100 developers worldwide. Both structures would be developed under design–build contracts, wherein the same firm was responsible for design and construction. Additionally, the designs of both buildings had to complement other structures in the neighborhood. Several GSA committees reviewed the first sets of designs in detail. The GSA had planned to select developers for both projects in January 1989, but it had not made a selection for either site by that February. U.S. senator Daniel Patrick Moynihan, a supporter of the new development, criticized the delays. By the middle of 1989, the GSA had selected three development teams as finalists for the two projects. The finalists sent their designs to a GSA advisory group, which only provided general feedback on whether the designs met the GSA's requirements.

To expedite the construction process, the federal government proposed acquiring the land through a "friendly condemnation", in which the city would not object to its property being acquired through eminent domain. The alternative, wherein the city government would sell the sites for a nominal fee, would require review by various agencies and would take up to a year. In November 1989, U.S. president George H. W. Bush signed a modified agreement to allow the condemnation of the sites. Under the agreement, the developers of the respective buildings (rather than the federal government) would compensate the city government. At two hearings in September 1990, residents of the nearby Lower East Side neighborhood expressed their opposition to the project. The next month, the GSA received a $797 million loan from the Federal Financing Bank for the two projects. The GSA was legally required to seek new bids because it had significantly changed the terms of financing, but then-GSA chief Richard Austin did not seek new bids, citing an "emergency" need for the two structures. The city government received $104 million for the two sites in December 1990.

=== Construction ===
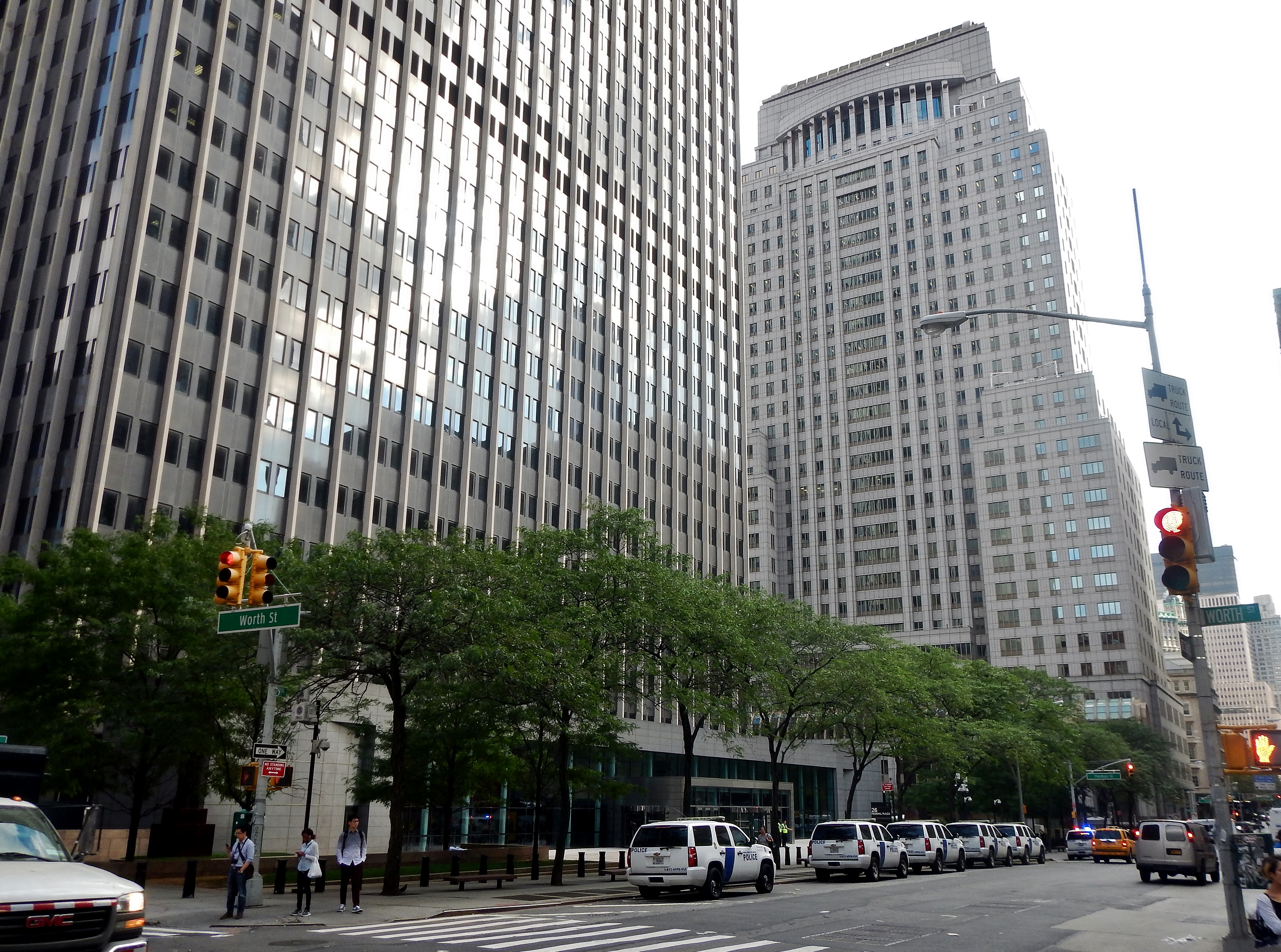
The Javits Federal Building (left) and Weiss Federal Building (right) as seen from Broadway to the north

Federal officials awarded $700 million in contracts for the two projects at the end of March 1991. By then, demand for new office space had decreased, and 17.5 percent of all office space in Lower Manhattan was vacant. The Linpro Company was awarded the contract to develop the office building at 290 Broadway, which would be designed by HOK and constructed by Tishman at a cost $276 million. The office building was to contain 974,000 square feet (90,500 m^{2}) of gross floor area. There would be space for 4,200 workers on 34 floors, as well as 14,000 square feet (1,300 m^{2}) of storefronts. The original plan had included a 25,000-square-foot (2,300 m^{2}) public pavilion near Elk Street, which would house day care facilities, an auditorium, and 55,000 square feet (5,100 m^{2}) of parking below the building. The building was to be known as One Foley Square. During the design process, HOK, Linpro, and Tishman frequently consulted with each other about the details of the design. Work on the tower's structural steel began before the details of the design had been finalized.

Under the terms of its agreement with the GSA, Linpro had to subcontract at least $36 million of the work, or 13 percent of the project's total cost, to minority-owned firms. Residents of the nearby Chinatown neighborhood raised complaints that the project did not hire enough members of that community. At a protest in July 1992, demonstrators alleged that only two of fifty-two firms working on the One Foley Square project were Asian-American firms and that no Asian-American workers were actually employed on the project. At least 40 percent of Chinatown's population was Chinese, and protesters requested that at least 30 percent of the workforce be Asians. Linpro denied that it was discriminating against Asians, and it offered contracts to several Asian-run businesses following the demonstration. Ultimately, in November 1992, Linpro subcontracted $64 million of work to 63 "small or disadvantaged" local firms, including women-owned and minority-owned firms.

==== Excavations and change in plans ====
Because the GSA had determined that the site might have contained artifacts from the old Five Points neighborhood, archeologists began excavating the site in May 1991, as was required under the National Historic Preservation Act of 1966. In October 1991, during the excavation process, intact burials of human remains were discovered under Manhattan and Republican alleys. The GSA had conducted an environmental impact statement (EIS) before purchasing the site, concluding that human remains would not be found because of the long history of urban development in that area. Initially, construction of the tower section proceeded as normal, even as additional remains were discovered, further delaying the project.

The discovery of the remains prompted strong responses from the African-American community, who wanted the site to be preserved. Activists protested the GSA's handling of the burials in early 1992 after it was found that some intact burials were broken up during excavation. New York City mayor David Dinkins sought to delay the excavation, and other African American political leaders called for the project to be halted altogether. U.S. representative Gus Savage, chairman of the committee that reviewed GSA projects, also pressured the agency to halt the work. Federal officials announced in July 1992 that they had permanently halted all work on the eastern end of the site, which would have contained the pavilion. Instead, federal officials suggested that this site be used as a museum. The next month, U.S. senator Al D'Amato secured $3 million for a memorial to African Americans there. The GSA provided additional funding to conduct a further archeological excavation.

Following the discoveries, the New York City Landmarks Preservation Commission announced in late 1992 that it would consider designating the surrounding area as a city historic district. The LPC created the district in February 1993; this designation required the LPC to approve any projects that could possibly disturb the remains. This was followed by the creation of a federal historic district that April. By then, the site directly under the tower had been cleared, but officials had determined that the extent of the burial ground was too large to be fully excavated. Workers ultimately found the remains of 419 persons, which were taken to Howard University for further examination. After controversy and negotiations, the planned pavilion was removed from the building plans by 1993. The tower, which was already under construction, remained unchanged. Officials had formed a committee to determine how to memorialize those who had been buried at the site. In lieu of the pavilion, a 50-foot high interior arcade with a vaulted top was constructed.

=== Opening and use ===
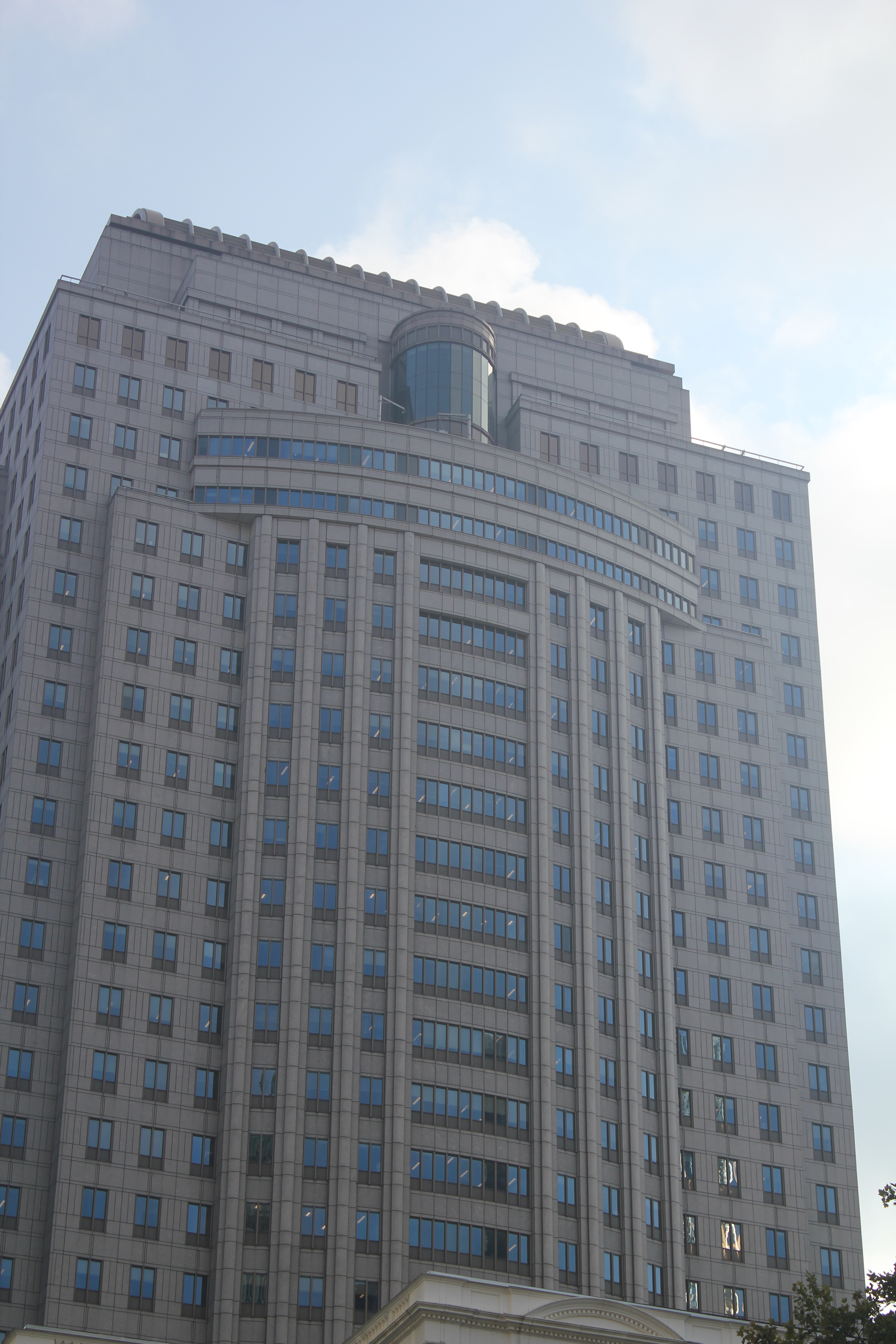
The building seen from the south

The New York Times reported in early 1995 that the building was nearly completed, although later sources cited the building's completion date as 1994. When the building opened, it was known merely as the Federal Office Building and housed the Environmental Protection Agency (EPA), the Internal Revenue Service (IRS), and the Federal Bureau of Investigation (FBI). The Federal Office Building was also intended to provide space for other agencies that could not fit in the Javits Federal Building. Meanwhile, the site of the canceled pavilion at Elk and Duane streets remained vacant for several years because multiple teams of scientists could not agree on what to do with the 419 sets of remains. Instead, the site was covered with a sod lawn, which in turn was surrounded by a chain-link fence. A coalition of private organizations had sponsored an architectural design competition for a monument on the site, selecting four finalist designs in 1994, but no action had been taken on the proposal.

By 1997, the GSA was sponsoring two architectural design competitions for an African Burial Ground memorial at Duane and Elk streets. The memorial was to include a $1.7 million "interpretive center" in the building's lobby, as well as an outdoor monument. The GSA was soliciting designs by the next year, and it selected a consortium of African American architects to design the exhibition space in the building's lobby in March 2000. At the time, the exhibition space was planned to be completed by the end of 2001. However, the exhibition space was still not open by late 2002. In addition, the GSA had planned to re-inter the 419 sets of remains from the site, but that was also delayed. The building was renamed in April 2003 for Ted Weiss (1927–1992), who had been a Democratic member of the United States House of Representatives from New York. The renaming was controversial because Weiss had been white. Some opponents, including city councilman Charles Barron, advocated for the building to be renamed for an African American. Later the same year, officials re-interred the 419 sets of remains at Elk and Duane Streets.

The GSA chose the winning design for the African Burial Ground memorial, by Rodney Leon and Nicole Hollant-Denis, in April 2005. The next year, the federal government announced plans for a $8 million memorial at the site, including a $5 million visitors' center in the Weiss Building's lobby, as part of the African Burial Ground National Monument. The outdoor portion of the memorial next to the building was dedicated in 2007, and the visitor center in the building itself opened in February 2010. The EPA, the IRS, and the FBI remained the building's principal tenants in the 2010s.

== Critical reception ==
When the building was nearing completion in 1994, Herbert Muschamp wrote for The New York Times: "One of the good things about the design is that it takes advantage of the Javits Building's sad little plaza. Like a makeshift forecourt, the plaza opens the view to the new building's northern facade, creating an impression of a gateway" to Lower Manhattan. Muschamp subsequently compared the Weiss Federal Building and the Moynihan Courthouse to "a pair of nicely cut gray suits", contrasting with the "bleak" architecture of the Javits Building, although he objected to the fact that the buildings still resembled 1930s-era designs. Muschamp believed that the design undermined the reputation of two older courthouses on Foley Square, saying: "Instead of affirming that authority, the new buildings expose how hollow it has become." Susanna Sirefman was also critical of the project, calling the design "dull but not offensive. Authoritative massing combined with staid grey cladding created a dignified and unobtrusive effect."

== Sources ==
- African Burial Ground & The Commons Historic District (PDF) (Report). New York City Landmarks Preservation Commission. February 25, 1993.
- Historic Structures Report: African Burial Ground (Report). National Register of Historic Places, National Park Service. April 19, 1993.
- Stern, Robert A. M.; Fishman, David; Tilove, Jacob (2006). New York 2000: Architecture and Urbanism Between the Bicentennial and the Millennium (2000 ed.). New York: Monacelli Press. ISBN 978-1-58093-177-9.
