= Barbara Chase-Riboud =

American writer and artist (born 1939)

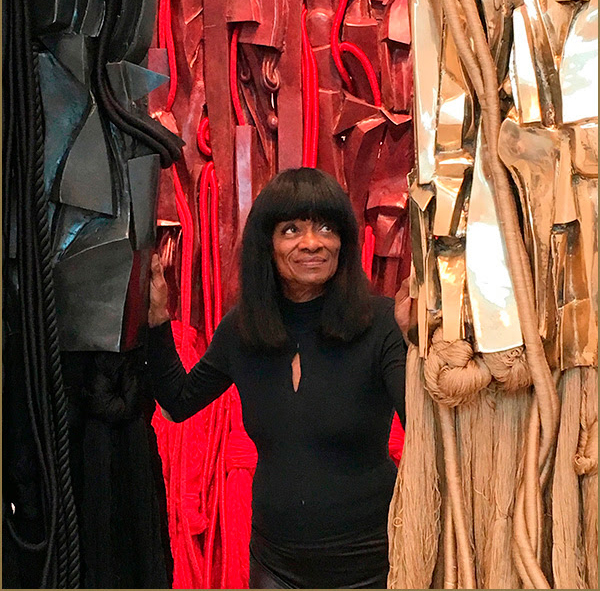
- Born: June 26, 1939 (age 87); Philadelphia, Pennsylvania, U.S.
- Citizenship: United States; France
- Education: Philadelphia High School for Girls; Philadelphia Museum School of Art (BFA); American Academy in Rome; Yale University (MFA)
- Occupations: Visual artist; sculptor; novelist; poet
- Spouse(s): Marc Riboud (m. 1961, divorced) Sergio Tosi (m. 1981)
- Children: 2
- Parent(s): Charles Edward Chase; Vivian May Chase
- Writing career
- Notable awards: Janet Heidinger Kafka Prize (1979)
- Website: chaseriboud.free.fr/index.html

Barbara Chase-Riboud (born June 26, 1939) is an American and French visual artist, sculptor, novelist, and poet.

After becoming established as a sculptor and poet, Chase-Riboud gained widespread recognition as an author for her novel Sally Hemings (1979). It earned the Janet Heidinger Kafka Prize in Fiction, and became an international success.

Chase-Riboud's novel about Sally Hemings generated discussion about the likely relationship between the young enslaved woman and her master, Thomas Jefferson, who became president of the United States. Mainline historians rejected Chase-Riboud's portrayal and persuaded CBS not to produce a planned TV mini-series adapted from the novel. Following DNA analysis of descendants in 1998, the Jefferson-Hemings relationship is widely accepted by historians as fact, including those who had objected before.

From September 2024 to January 2025, the solo exhibition Barbara Chase-Riboud: Everytime A Knot is Undone, A God is Released showcased her sculpture, drawing and poetry from 1958 to the present in eight major institutions in Paris, France – Musée d’Orsay, Palais de la Porte Dorée, Musée du Louvre, Philharmonie de Paris, Centre Pompidou, Musée du Quai Branly, Musée Guimet and Palais de Tokyo – the first such celebration of a living artist.

== Early life and education ==
Barbara Chase was born in Philadelphia, Pennsylvania, the only child of Vivian May Chase, a histology technician, and Charles Edward Chase, a contractor. Chase displayed an early talent for the arts and began attending the Fleisher Art Memorial School at the age of eight. She was suspended from her middle school after being accused, mistakenly, of plagiarizing her poem "Autumn Leaves". She attended Philadelphia High School for Girls from 1948 to 1952, graduating summa cum laude. During graduation, her text "Of Understanding" was read. She continued her training at the Philadelphia Museum School of Art.

In 1956, Chase received a Bachelor of Fine Arts from the Tyler School at Temple University. In that same year, Chase won a John Hay Whitney fellowship to study at the American Academy in Rome for 12 months. There, she created her first bronze sculptures and exhibited her work. During this time, she traveled to Egypt, where she discovered non-European art. In 1960, Chase completed a MFA degree from Yale University School of Design and Architecture. She is the first African-American woman to have received the MFA degree from Yale University. After completing her studies, Chase left the United States for London, England, and then Paris, France.

== Career ==
Chase-Riboud is an acclaimed sculptor, poet, and novelist. She has worked across a variety of media throughout her long career.

=== Visual arts ===
At Temple University's Tyler School of Art, she studied with Boris Blai and was "instructed in sculpture, painting, graphic design, printmaking, color theory, and restoration." She also studied anatomical drawing at Temple University School of Medicine.

Chase-Riboud's modern abstract sculptures often combine the durable and rigid metals of bronze and aluminum with softer elements made from silk or other textile material. Using the lost wax method, Chase-Riboud carves, bends, folds, and manipulates large sheets of wax prior to casting molds of the handmade designs. She then pours the metal to produce the metal-work, which melts the original wax sculpture. The finished metal is then combined with material threads, which are manipulated into knots and cords, and often serve as the base for the metal portion of her sculptures, including those of the "Malcolm X Steles".

In 1955, her woodcut Reba was displayed in the Carnegie Hall Gallery as a part of the exhibit It's All Yours (sponsored by Seventeen magazine). This woodcut was subsequently purchased by the Museum of Modern Art.

The Temple University yearbook Templar published fourteen of her woodcuts in 1956. She created her first direct wax-casting sculptures while at the American Academy in Rome in 1957 on a John Hay Whitney fellowship. In 1958 Chase began to experiment with bronze sculptures, using lost-wax casting techniques.

Her first solo exhibition was at the Galleria L'Obelisco at the Spoleto Festival of Two Worlds in Italy in 1957. Her first museum exhibition in Europe was held at MOMA Paris in 1961. Her first solo gallery exhibition in Paris was at the Galerie Cadran Solaire in 1966.

Her first public commission was completed in 1960 for the Wheaton Plaza in Wheaton, Maryland. This fountain was formed from pressed aluminum and incorporated abstract shapes, sound and light effects to add to the vision of the falling water.

In the late 1960s, Chase-Riboud began to garner broad attention for her sculpture. Nancy Heller describes her work as "startling, ten-foot-tall sculptures that combine powerful cast-bronze abstract shapes with veils of fiber ropes made from silk and wool".

Chase-Riboud exhibited work at the First World Festival of Black Arts in Dakar, Senegal, in 1966, and she attended the Pan-African Festival in Algiers in 1969.

La Musica Red Parkway / Josephine Red (2007) at Glenstone in 2023

Chase-Riboud and Betye Saar were the first African-American women to exhibit in the Whitney Museum of American Art, following protests organized by Faith Ringgold to gain more recognition of Black women artists. Her piece The Ultimate Ground was displayed in the exhibition Contemporary American Sculpture.

In 1971, Chase-Riboud was featured along with four other contemporaries in Five, a documentary about African-American artists. The segment on Chase-Riboud showed her installation in 1970 at the Betty Parsons Gallery, in addition to the artist working in her studio.

In 1996, Chase-Riboud was among artists commissioned for artwork at the African Burial Ground National Monument in Lower Manhattan. Her 18-foot bronze memorial, Africa Rising, was installed in the Ted Weiss Federal Building in 1998. Chase-Riboud also wrote a poem with the same name as the sculpture.

Continuing to work as a sculptor throughout her life, Chase-Riboud creates drawings and sculptures that are exhibited and collected by museums such as the Whitney Museum of American Art, New York, the Newark Museum, New Jersey, the Tehran Museum of Contemporary Art, Iran, and the Metropolitan Museum of Art, New York. During September 2013 to January 2014, she exhibited artwork spanning fifty years at the Philadelphia Museum of Art's exhibition: Barbara Chase-Riboud: The Malcolm X Steles. This traveled to the Berkeley Art Museum and Pacific Film Archive from February 12 to April 28, 2014.

Her work was featured in the 2015 exhibition We Speak: Black Artists in Philadelphia, 1920s–1970s at the Woodmere Art Museum.

From September 2024 to January 2025, the exhibition Barbara Chase-Riboud: Everytime A Knot Is Undone, A God Is Released, showcasing the artist's sculpture, drawing and poetry from 1958 to the present was on view across eight separate institutions in Paris: Musée d’Orsay, Palais de la Porte Dorée, Musée du Louvre, Philharmonie de Paris, Centre Pompidou, Musée du Quai Branly, Musée Guimet and Palais de Tokyo. The scale of the show and number of museums involved in the exhibition was described by The New York Times as a first for any living artist.

Her work was included in the 2024 exhibition Making Their Mark: Works from the Shah Garg Collection at the Berkeley Art Museum and Pacific Film Archive (BAMPFA).

Her work is in museum collections and museums including Metropolitan Museum of Art and the Museum of Modern Art, New York City; and Lannan Foundation, Los Angeles.

=== Literary career ===
Chase-Riboud has received numerous honors for her literary work, including the Carl Sandburg Prize for poetry and the Women's Caucus for Art's lifetime achievement award. In 1965, she became the first American woman to visit the People's Republic of China after the revolution. In 1996, she was knighted by the French Government and received the Ordre des Arts et des Lettres. Chase-Riboud attained international recognition with the publication of her first novel, Sally Hemings (1979). The novel has been described as the "first full blown imagining" of Hemings and her life as a slave, including her long-rumored concubine relationship with President Thomas Jefferson. In addition to stimulating considerable controversy, as mainline historians of the time denied the relationship and the mixed-race children she bore to Jefferson, the book earned Chase-Riboud the Janet Heidinger Kafka Prize for the best novel written by an American woman. Sally Hemings sold more than one million copies in hardcover and it was a Book-of-the-Month Club selection. It was reissued in 1994. In 2009, it was published in paperback, together with her novel, President's Daughter (1994), about Harriet Hemings, daughter of Hemings and Jefferson, who passed into white society.

Chase-Riboud began her writing career as a poet, publishing her first work Memphis & Peking (1974), edited by Toni Morrison, and more recent collections. Everytime a Knot Is Undone, a God Is Released: Collected and New Poems 1974–2011 is Chase-Riboud's latest, published in 2014.

She has continued her literary exploration into the enslavement and exploitation of African people with her subsequent novels. Valide: A Novel of the Harem (1986) examined slavery in the Ottoman Empire. Her Echo of Lions (1989) was one of the first serious novels about the historic Amistad slave-ship revolt of 1839. Hottentot Venus: A Novel (2003) explores the life of Sarah Baartman, a Khoikhoi woman who was exhibited naked in freak shows in 19th-century Europe.

In 1994, Chase-Riboud published The President's Daughter, a work that continues the Sally Hemings story, by imagining the life of her and Jefferson's mixed-race daughter Harriet Hemings; she and all the children were seven-eighths European or white by ancestry. At the age of 21, Harriet left Monticello, given traveling money by Jefferson via his overseer, and went North. She settled in Washington, D.C., where her brother Beverley had already settled. Like him, she passed into white society. She married a white man, according to her letters to her brother Madison Hemings. Madison was the only one of the four surviving Hemings children who lived the remainder of his life identifying as African-American. After moving from Ohio to Wisconsin in 1852, Eston Hemings and his family took the surname "Jefferson" and passed into white society.

==== Sally Hemings: A Novel ====
In 1979, Chase-Riboud gained widespread attention and critical acclaim for her writing with her first novel Sally Hemings. It was based on the life of Thomas Jefferson's quadroon slave of that name; she was a much-younger half-sister to his late wife and was rumored to have been his concubine for years. In the Summer of 1974, Chase-Riboud had met with editor Jacqueline Onassis to discuss her plans for the work, and Onassis persuaded her to write it. Based on Fawn M. Brodie's biography of Jefferson, Chase-Riboud was among those who believed that Thomas Jefferson fathered six children with Hemings. The young slave was nearly thirty years younger than the president and little had been documented about her life.

Chase-Riboud was the first writer to present a fully realized, fictional character of Sally Hemings, with a rich interior life. Finally, Sally Hemings had a voice. The public accepted her portrayal and could believe such a woman had a relationship with Jefferson. Sally Hemings was vivid as an American historical figure. Chase-Riboud's book became an international bestseller, selling more than one million hardcover books, and won the Janet Heidinger Kafka Prize in fiction by an American woman.

It was so popular that CBS planned to adapt it as a television mini-series. But mainline historians who were still "guarding" Jefferson put pressure on CBS president William S. Paley to end the effort. No adaptation was made at the time.

However, more than twenty years later, CBS produced Sally Hemings: An American Scandal (2000), a made-for-television mini-series that portrays Hemings's and Jefferson's relationship. This has been widely accepted since a 1998 DNA study showed a match between a Hemings descendant and the Jefferson male line.

Although some reviewers argued about the characterization of Sally Hemings, "no major historian challenged the series' premise that Hemings and Jefferson had a 38-year relationship that produced children." The series featured a beautiful actress as Sally Hemings, as historic accounts agreed on her beauty. It also presented African Americans of a range of skin tones. The extended enslaved Hemings family was large (Sally had five siblings), and numerous enslaved mixed-race descendants worked as house slaves and artisans at Monticello.

A rearguard of Jefferson historians has continued to deny the possibility of a relationship, but in 2000 and 2001 the Thomas Jefferson Foundation at Monticello, and the National Genealogical Society independently announced their conclusions that Jefferson had likely fathered all of Hemings's children, based on both the DNA and the weight of other historical evidence. This historic consensus has been reflected in academic writing about Jefferson and his times. The Smithsonian Museum and Monticello collaborated on a groundbreaking exhibition in 2012 in Washington, DC: Slavery at Jefferson's Monticello, which explored Jefferson as a slaveholder and six of the major slave families. It said that Jefferson was likely the father of all Sally Hemings' children. The exhibit was seen by more than one million people.

Chase-Riboud explored the intricate relationships between the Hemings's and Jefferson families. Because Sally Hemings was a much-younger half-sister of Jefferson's late wife (they had the same father, John Wayles), she was an aunt to his two daughters.

In place of civic myths that deny America's mixed-race beginnings, Chase-Riboud turns to the Hemings family to unveil the historical presence of antebellum interracial relationships and the possibilities of a post-civil rights multiracial community.

Artists, poets, and writers have been thoroughly exploring the Jefferson-Hemings relationship since then.

In 1991, Chase-Riboud won an important copyright decision, Granville Burgess vs. Chase-Riboud. She had filed suit against the playwright of Dusky Sally in 1987, shortly before a production was to open at the Walnut Street Theatre in Philadelphia. She said his work infringed on her copyright for her novel Sally Hemings because it borrowed her fictional ideas. Judge Robert F. Kelly concluded that while

laws were not enacted to inhibit creativity ... it is one thing to inhibit creativity and another to use the idea-versus-expression distinction as something akin to an absolute defense – to maintain that the protection of copyright law is negated by any small amount of tinkering with another writer's idea that results in a different expression."

He also said,

the similarity between the two works is so obvious and so unapologetic that an ordinary observer can only conclude that Burgess felt he was justified in copying 'Sally Hemings,' or at least that there was no legal impediment to doing so, assuming a few modifications were made." The resulting decision constituted a significant victory for artists and writers, reinforcing protection for creative ideas even when expressed in a slightly different form."

==== Chase-Riboud v. Dreamworks lawsuit ====
In 1997, Chase-Riboud settled a suit against DreamWorks for $10 million on charges of copyright infringement of her novel about the Amistad mutiny, Echo of Lions. The writer claimed that the screenplay for Steven Spielberg's film Amistad (1997) plagiarized her novel on the topic.

It was finally established that David Franzoni, the sole credited screenwriter on Amistad, had spent three years, beginning in 1993, writing a script based on Chase-Riboud's book, Echo of Lions. This was under an option held by Dustin Hoffman's Punch Productions. Franzoni claimed he had never read Chase-Riboud's book, which she had sold to Hoffman's production company. Burt Fields, DreamWorks main lawyer, was at the same time, unbeknownst to Chase-Riboud's attorneys, a stockholder, lawyer and board member of Punch Productions. He did not recuse himself from the suit, but had Punch Productions dropped from the original complaint. Franzoni was never obliged to testify under oath. He may have carried over some of his thinking to his screenplay for Amistad. When Chase-Riboud filed a second suit against DreamWorks in France, the dispute was quickly settled out of court for an undisclosed amount days before the 1998 Oscar nominations were announced.

=== Poetry ===
Chase-Riboud's first work of poetry, From Memphis & Peking (1974), was edited by Toni Morrison and published to critical acclaim. Her poetry volume, Portrait of a Nude Woman as Cleopatra, (1987), won the Carl Sandburg Award in 1988. In 1994, Chase-Riboud published Roman Egyptien, poetry written in French. In 2014, she published Everytime a Knot is Undone, a God is Released: Collected and New Poems 1974–2011. She contributed the poem "Ode to My Grandfather at the Somme 1918" to the 2019 anthology New Daughters of Africa, edited by Margaret Busby.

== Other activities ==
Photographed by Jack Davison and choreographed by Lenio Kaklea, Chase-Riboud was featured in Bottega Veneta's 2025 advertising campaign celebrating the 50th anniversary of its signature Intrecciato leather.

== Personal life ==
In Paris, Chase met Marc Riboud, a photographer who was part of the Magnum group. They married in 1961 on Christmas Day in a church. The couple had two sons together, David Charles Riboud (b. 1964) and Alexis Karol Riboud (b. 1967), and they traveled extensively in Russia, India, Greece and North Africa.

Years later they divorced. In 1981, Chase-Riboud married her second husband, Sergio Tosi, an art publisher and expert.

Chase-Riboud is a dual citizen of the United States and France.

== Legacy and honors ==
- 1957: John Hay Whitney Fellowship
- National Endowment for the Arts Fellowship
- 1979: Janet Heidinger Kafka Prize for Excellence in Fiction by an American woman, for Sally Hemings.
- 1988: Carl Sandburg Prize for Portrait of a Nude Woman as Cleopatra
- 1993: honorary Doctorate of Letters from Muhlenberg College.
- 1995: James Van Dar Zee Award for Lifetime Achievement
- 1996: honorary Doctorate of Letters from the University of Connecticut.
- 1996, knighted by the French Government and awarded the Chevalier des Arts et des Lettres.
- 1996: commissioned by the United States General Services Administration for the memorial, Africa Rising, at 240 Broadway, site of the newly designated African Burial Ground National Monument, next to the federal courthouse in Lower Manhattan.
- 2004: Nominated Hurston/Wright Legacy Award (Fiction) for Hottentot Venus
- 2005: "Best Fiction Book of 2004" by the Black Caucus of the American Library Association for Hottentot Venus
- 2007: College Art Association Women's Caucus for Art lifetime achievement award.
- 2007: Alain Locke Award from Detroit Institute of Arts
- 2020: "Anonymous Was A Woman" from the Rockefeller Foundation
- 2021: "Laureate of Prix d'Honneur" from AWARE (Archives of Women Artists, Research and Exhibitions)
- 2021: "Laureate of Grand Prix Artistique de la Fondation Simone et Cino del Duca"
- 2022: knighted by the French Government and awarded the "Legion d'Honneur".

== Selected works ==
=== Sculptures ===
- Last Supper (1958)
- Bullfighter (1958)
- Malcolm X (1970)
- Why Did We Leave Zanibar (1971)
- The Albino (1972)
- Confession for Myself (1973)
- Cleopatra's Cape (1973)
- Africa Rising (1998)
- Mao's Organ (2008)

=== Novels ===
- Sally Hemings: A Novel (1979). ISBN 978-0-312-24704-1/reprinted in paperback, 2009
- Valide: A Novel of the Harem (1986). ISBN 978-0-688-04334-6
- Echo of Lions (1989). ISBN 978-0-688-06407-5
- The President's Daughter (1994). ISBN 978-0-345-38970-1/reprinted in paperback, 2009
- Hottentot Venus: A Novel (2003). ISBN 978-0-385-50856-8
- The Great Mrs. Elias: A Novel (2022). ISBN 978-0-063-01990-4

=== Poetry ===
- From Memphis & Peking (1974). ISBN 978-0-394-48899-8
- Portrait of a Nude Woman as Cleopatra (1987). ISBN 978-0-688-06403-7
- Everytime a Knot is Undone, a God is Released (2014). ISBN 978-1-60980-594-4

=== Memoir ===
- I Always Knew: A Memoir (2022). ISBN 9780691234274

== Related links ==
- The Art Blog
- Decades in the Making
- BCR's Malcolm X Steles Exhibit video on YouTube
- Fred B. Adelson, "Barbara Chase-Riboud brings Malcolm X sculptures home", USA Today, November 5, 2013
- Barbara Chase-Riboud papers at the Stuart A. Rose Library, Emory University
- "American expat artist living in Paris France – Barbara Chase-Riboud", YouTube video, April 27, 2010.
- "Memory Is Everything: Barbara Chase-Riboud", Barbara Chase-Riboud in conversation with Hans Ulrich Obrist, Mousse Magazine, 60
- Myth of a Colorblind France. Documentary by Alan Govenar featuring Barbara Chase-Riboud.
