= Ted Weiss =

American politician (1927–1992)

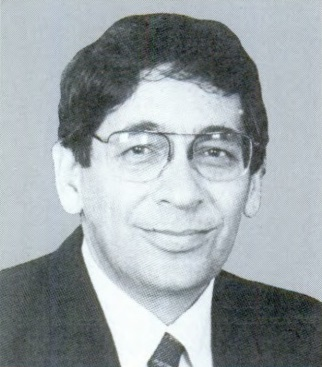

Member of the U.S. House of Representatives from New York
- In office January 3, 1977 – September 14, 1992
- Preceded by: Bella Abzug
- Succeeded by: Jerry Nadler
- Constituency: 20th district (1977–83); 17th district (1983–92)

Member of the New York City Council
- In office January 1, 1974 – December 31, 1976
- Preceded by: Louis Okin
- Succeeded by: Ruth Messinger
- Constituency: 25th district (1962–65); 3rd district (1966–73); 4th district (1974–76)

Personal details
- Born: September 17, 1927 Gáva, Kingdom of Hungary (now Gávavencsellő, Hungary)
- Died: September 14, 1992 (aged 64) New York City, U.S.
- Party: Democratic
- Spouse: Sonya
- Children: 2

Military service
- Allegiance: United States of America
- Branch/service: United States Army
- Years of service: 1946 – 1947

Theodore S. Weiss (September 17, 1927 – September 14, 1992) was an American Democratic Party politician who served in the United States House of Representatives for New York from 1977 until his death in 1992.

== Background ==
Weiss was born in 1927 in the Hungarian village of Gáva (now Gávavencsellő) and immigrated to the United States in 1938. He grew up in South Amboy, New Jersey. After graduating from H.G. Hoffman High School in South Amboy in 1946, Weiss served in the United States Army from 1946 to 1947. He graduated from Syracuse University in 1951 before earning his LL.B. from the institution's College of Law in 1952. In 1953, Weiss became a naturalized citizen of the United States. Between 1955 and 1959, he was an assistant New York County District Attorney, before leaving the position to return to private practice. He and his wife, Sonya, had two children.

== Political career ==
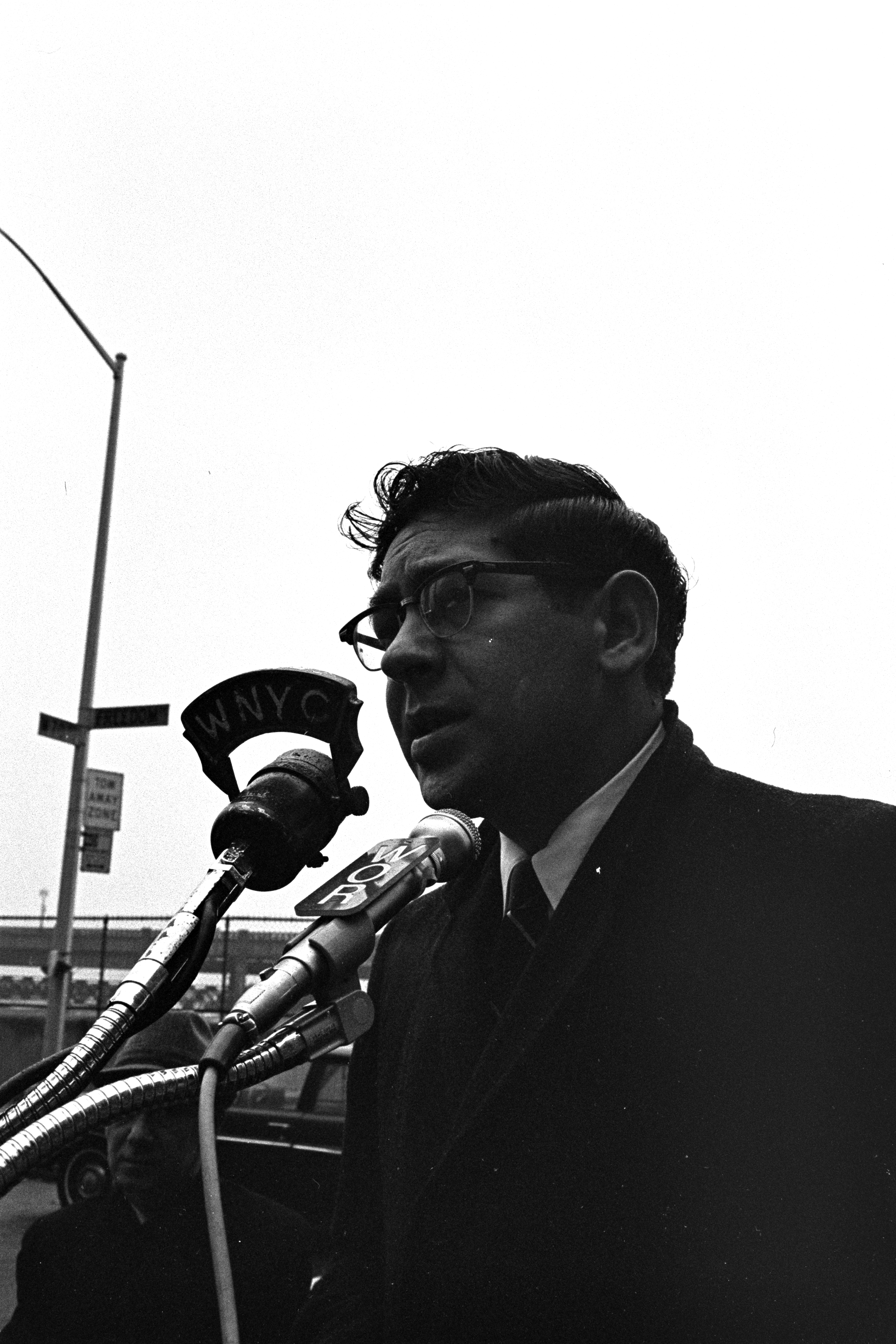
Weiss at the dedication of Freedom Place in Manhattan, named for slain civil rights activists James Chaney, Andrew Goodman, and Michael Schwerner, November 25, 1967

From 1962 until 1976, Weiss was a member of the New York City Council. He was a delegate to the 1972 Democratic National Convention. Weiss was elected to Congress in 1976, representing most of Manhattan's West Side, and served from January 3, 1977, until his death. He served on the House Committee on Banking, Finance, and Urban Affairs, the House Committee on Government Operations, and the House Committee on Foreign Affairs. In 1985, Weiss headed a committee that found 90 percent of the twenty to thirty thousand new drugs used on farm animals had not been approved by the Food and Drug Administration in violation of the Federal Food, Drug, and Cosmetic Act. They also found that the FDA failed to remove several drugs already known to be carcinogens. He was a leader in the fight for more federal funding for the HIV/AIDS epidemic and held the first congressional hearing on the government's response to the AIDS epidemic in 1983.

In 1983, he and seven other representatives sponsored a resolution to impeach Ronald Reagan over his sudden and unexpected invasion of Grenada.

Weiss was known for his avid support of liberal causes, including civil rights, open government, union and workers rights, access to health care, removal of the embargo on Cuba, and the arts. Weiss was also involved in fighting against the 1983 U.S. Navy plan to station nuclear capable vessels, notably USS Iowa (BB-61), at a new base at Stapleton, Staten Island, and in blocking the proposed Westway highway plan, after decades of opposition.

== Death and aftermath ==
On September 14, 1992, Weiss died from heart failure at Columbia Presbyterian Medical Center. His death came three days before the primary election for the renumbered 8th district, which would have also been the date of his sixty-fifth birthday. Due to the Congressman's ailing health, five Democrats appeared on the ballot to challenge him. Nonetheless, Weiss posthumously won the primary by a huge margin. State Assemblyman Jerry Nadler was named to replace Weiss on the ballot. Nadler won a special election for the balance of Weiss's eighth term, and a regular election for a full two-year term, and still holds the seat as of 2025.

The Ted Weiss Federal Building in Lower Manhattan, adjacent to the African Burial Ground National Monument, was named in Weiss's honor in 2003.

== See also ==
- List of Jewish members of the United States Congress
- List of members of the United States Congress who died in office (1950–1999)

== Sources ==
- United States Congress. "Ted Weiss (id: W000258)". Biographical Directory of the United States Congress.
- Appearances on C-SPAN

Political offices
Preceded by Louis Okin	Member of the New York City Council from the 25th district 1962–1965	Succeeded by Julius Moskowitz
Preceded by Newly created district	Member of the New York City Council from the 3rd district 1966–1973	Succeeded by Miriam Friedlander
Preceded by Carter Burden	Member of the New York City Council from the 4th district 1974–1976	Succeeded by Ruth Messinger
U.S. House of Representatives
Preceded by Bella Abzug	Member of the U.S. House of Representatives from New York's 20th congressional district 1977–1983	Succeeded by Richard Ottinger
Preceded by Guy Molinari	Member of the U.S. House of Representatives from New York's 17th congressional district 1983–1992	Succeeded by Jerry Nadler
