= Civic Center, Manhattan =

Neighborhood of Manhattan in New York City

Coordinates: 40°42′46″N 74°00′21″W

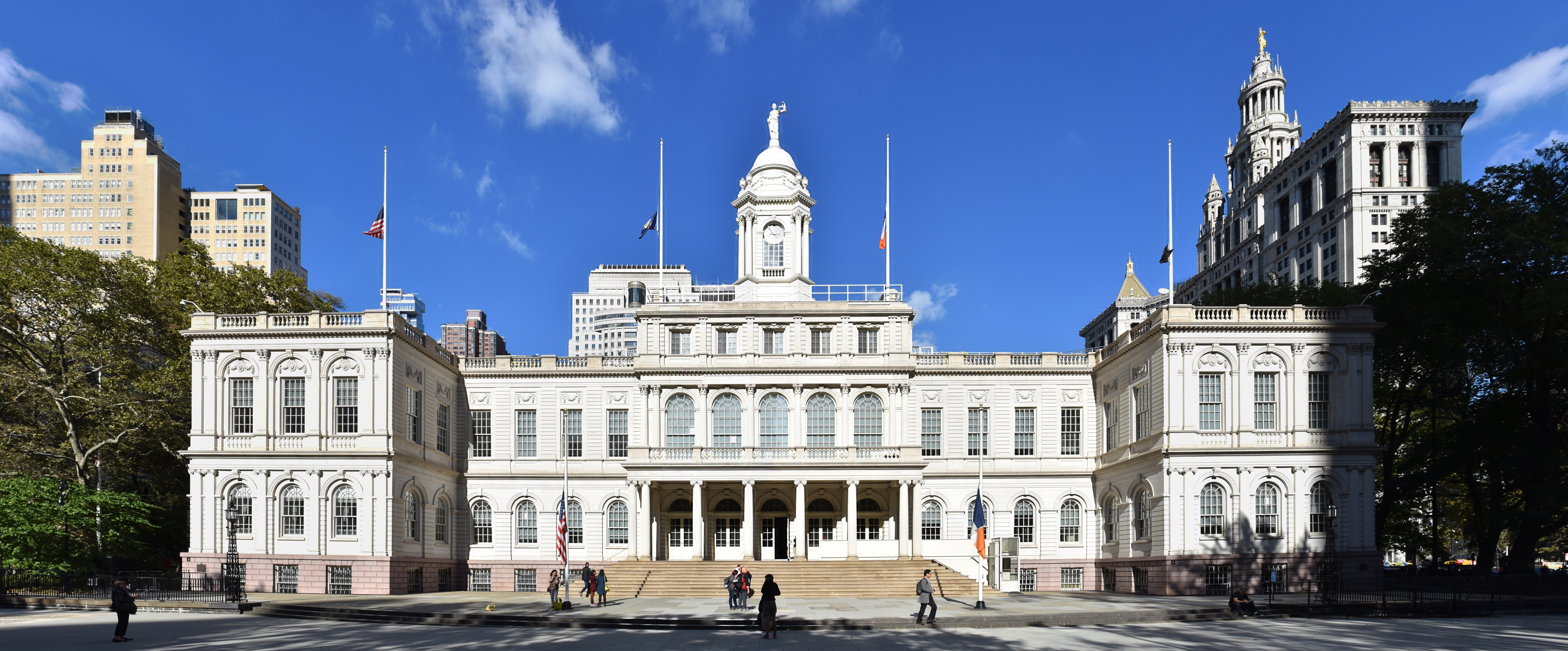
New York City Hall in the Civic Center neighborhood of Lower Manhattan

The Civic Center is an area and neighborhood in Lower Manhattan, New York City, that encompasses New York City Hall, One Police Plaza, the courthouses in Foley Square, the Metropolitan Correctional Center, and the surrounding area. The district is bound on the west by Tribeca at Broadway, on the north by Chinatown at Worth Street or Bayard Street, on the east by the East River and the Brooklyn Bridge at South Street, and on the south by the Financial District at Ann Street.

== Land use ==
Although government-related activities are predominant, other pursuits also occur within the district, including entertainment, industrial activity, residential dwellings, and warehousing. For example, there are Chinese restaurants near Civic Center's border with Chinatown, in addition to some museums and some residential buildings in the Civic Center area.

The area is roughly 10 blocks long and 5 blocks wide, but with only approximately 20,000 residents, it is far less dense than most of Manhattan, where the average number of residents for an area that size is around 35,000.

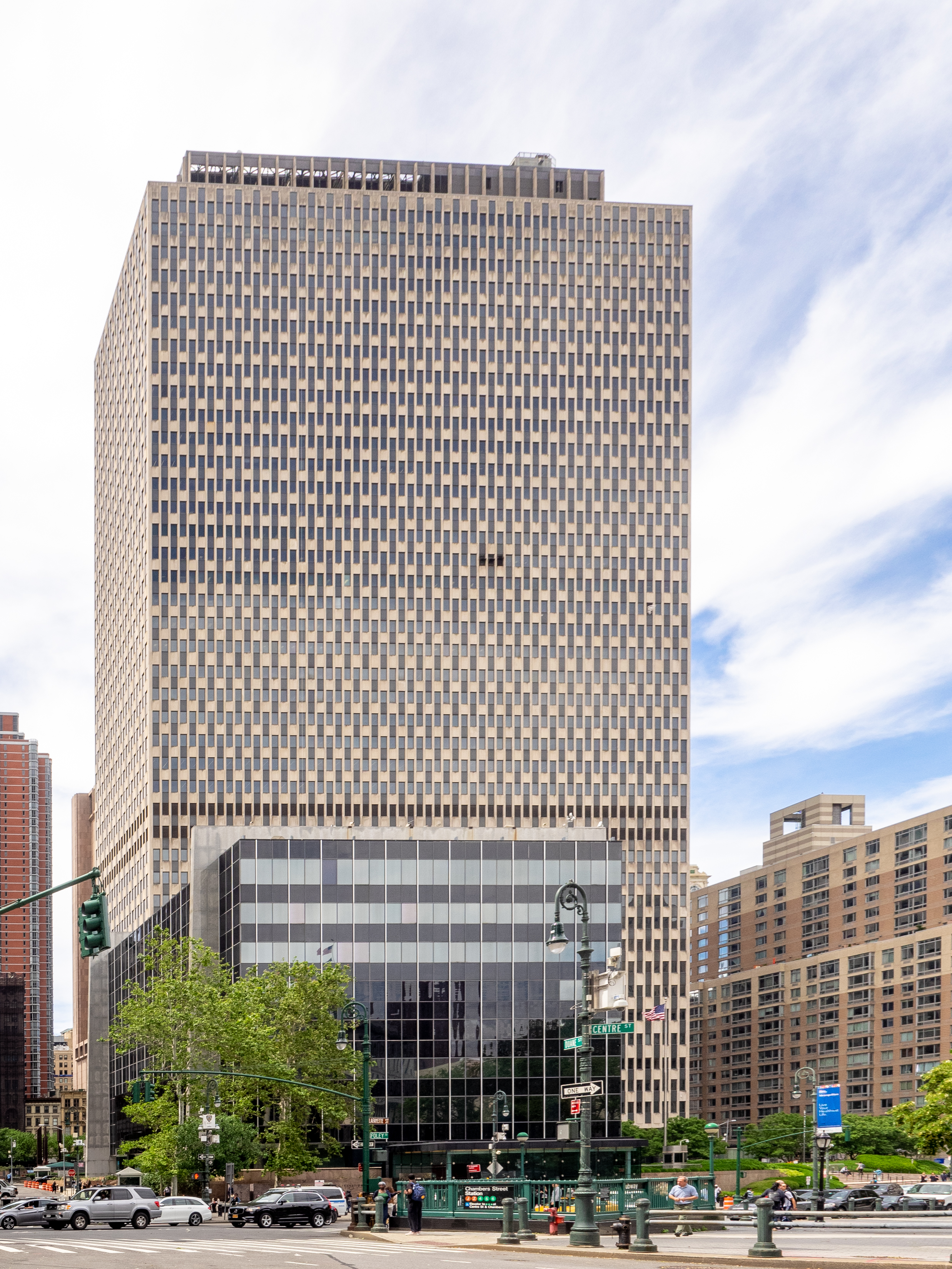
Javits Federal Building

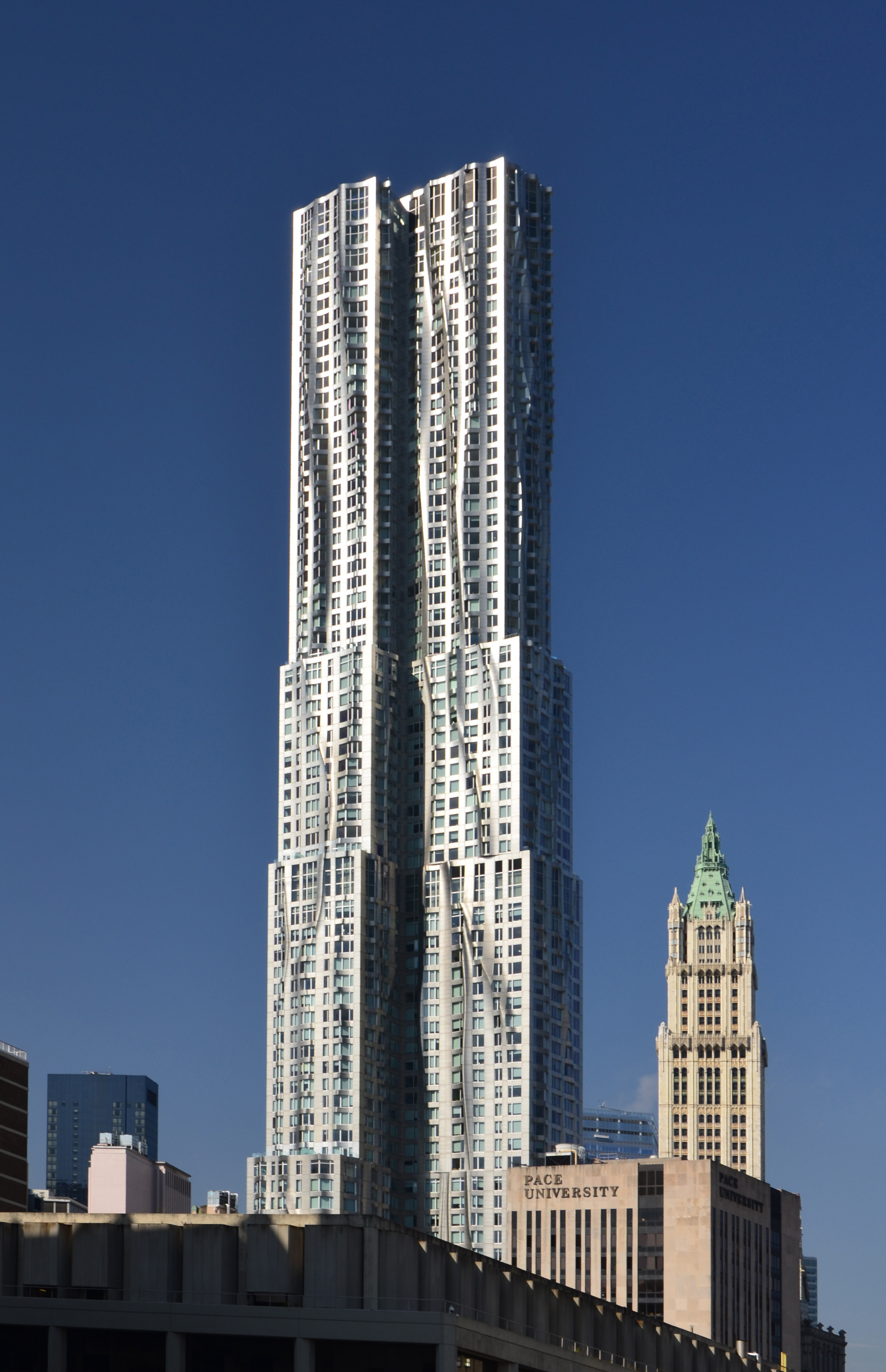
8 Spruce Street

The Jacob K. Javits Federal Building is located in the area, which includes the New York field office of the Federal Bureau of Investigation.

Non-government buildings include the 391 feet (119 m) 15 Park Row, an office and residential building which was the city's highest from 1899 to 1908. The 21-story granite 150 Nassau Street building was once a publisher's building, as were many in the area, but is now a residential building, as is the Potter Building at 38 Park Row. The 76-story 8 Spruce Street is among the world's tallest residential buildings. Southbridge Towers, once Mitchell-Lama affordable housing, is now market-rate housing.

== Lenape settlement ==
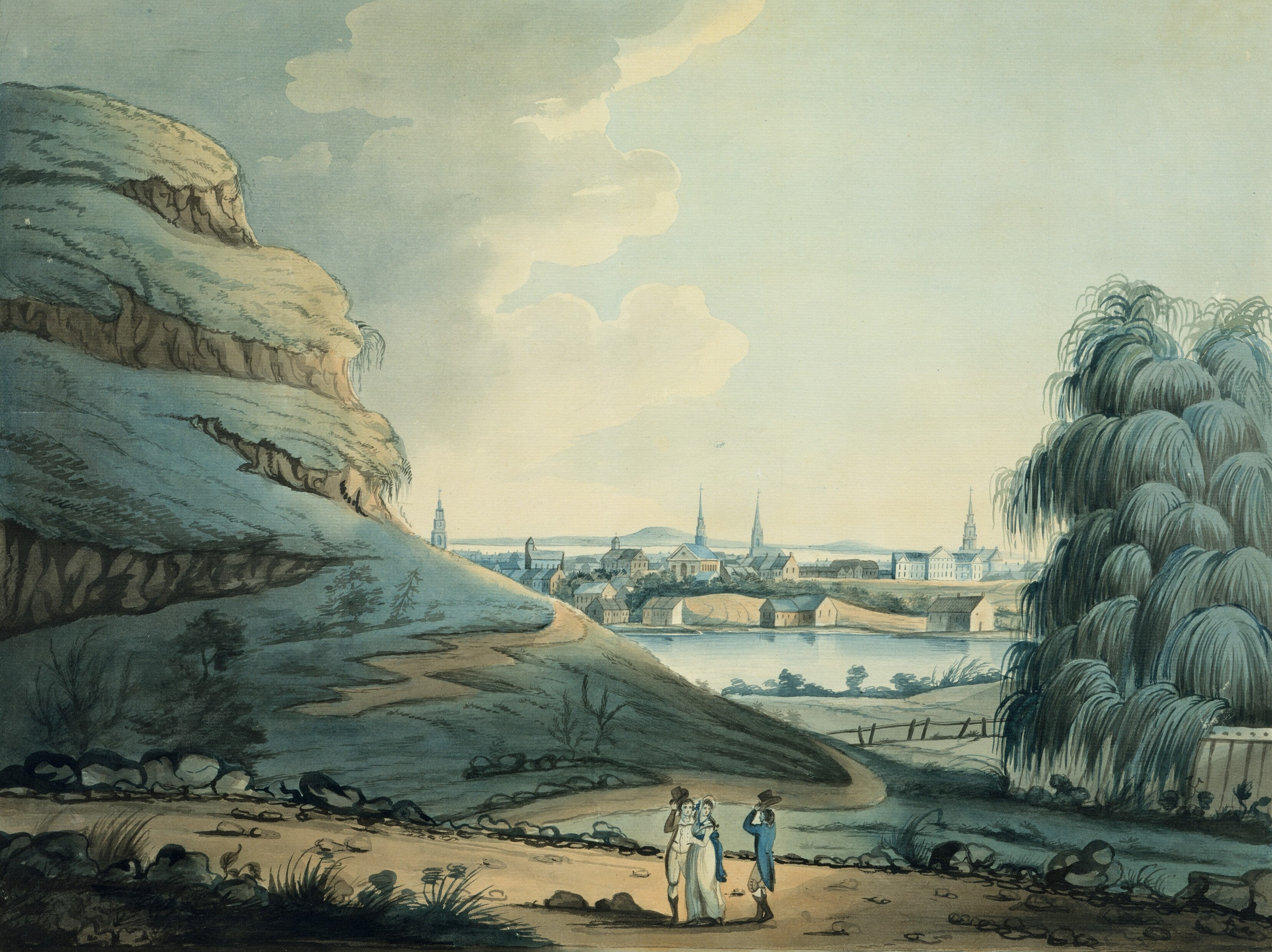
A 1798 watercolor painting of Collect Pond in the Civic Center neighborhood

Originally, the Lenape American Indians occupied the Civic Center area due to its rich pastoral fields and its proximity to the East River and Hudson River. There was a series of marshes in the area and a big pond in what is now Foley Square that the early settlers called "The Collect" or "Collect Pond". The area was so low lying that during the spring floods, the Indians could paddle from the East River to the Hudson River through the Collect Pond.

Then in 1609, Henry Hudson, an English explorer working for the Dutch, came and claimed the land for the Dutch. The colony there grew and farms began to expand, so the demand for workers increased. The Dutch West Indies Company decided to import slaves in 1625 to the new colony. The Civic Center was known as the commons and the first recorded building was a windmill built by Jan de Wit and Denys Hartogveldt in 1663. The next year, the colony was renamed New York and the state seal was created the following year. Farms continued to grow and slavery expanded rapidly. The slaves built a burial ground in the north area of the Civic Center. The slaves would bury people at night even though it was illegal, to ensure their brethren had a proper burial service. Because of the slaves' sneaking out and racism, the Trinity Church banned African burial ceremonies in 1697. This rule was then overturned in 1773.

The city continued expanding and the government system became increasingly powerful. The local government decided to finance their first public works building through public funding. In 1735, the Almshouse was built as a center to house the ill and impoverished, a jail, a workhouse and infirmary. A score later another jail was built called New Gaol, which was a debtor prison. Soldier barracks were built on the western border of the commons.

== Property development ==
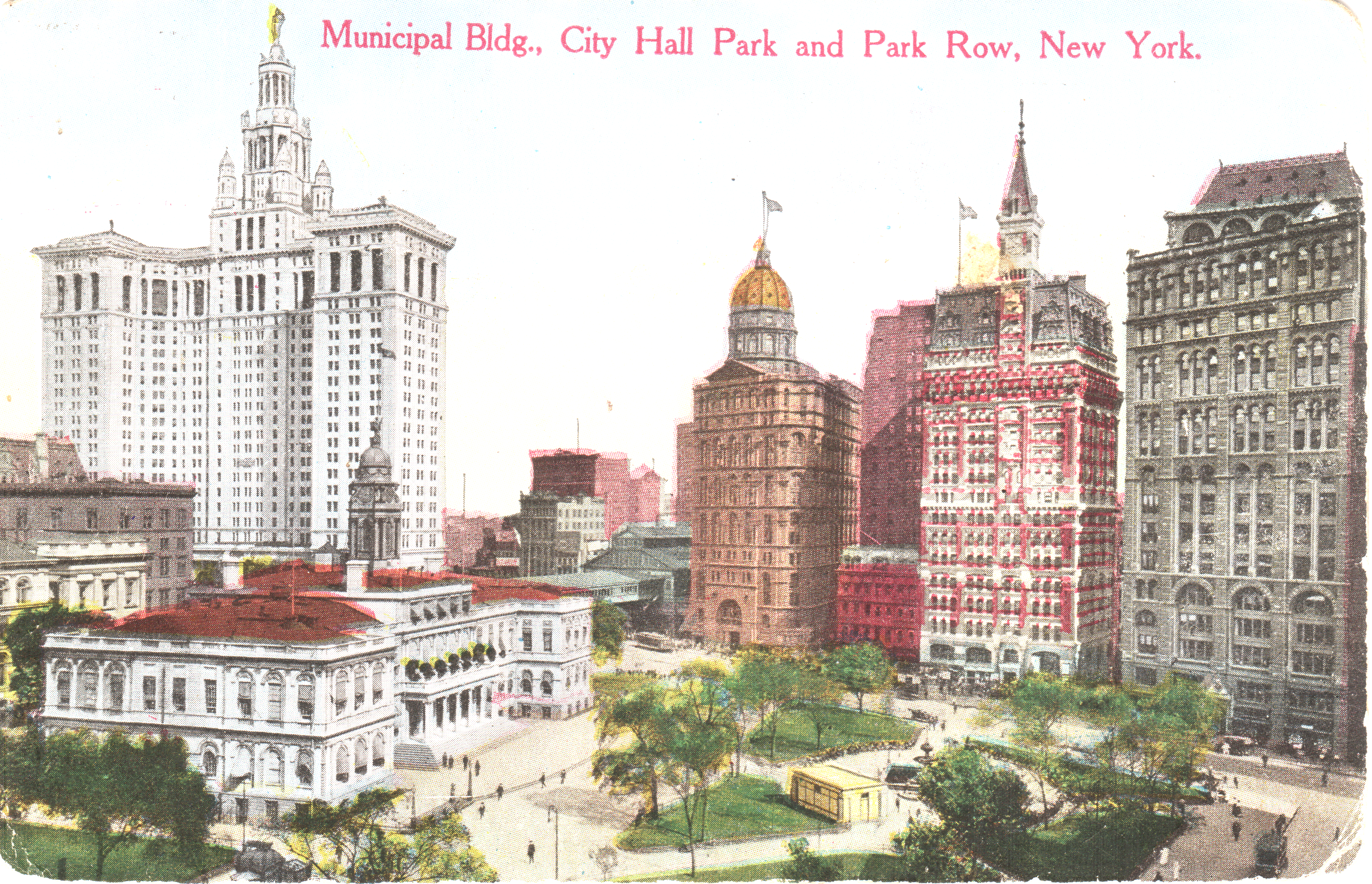
City Hall Park in the Civic Center neighborhood

During the Civil War, the old British soldiers' barracks were used as temporary barracks. Between 1869 and 1880, the City Hall Post Office and Courthouse was erected at the southern end of City Hall Park; the building was not well received and was demolished in 1939. The Tweed Courthouse was also built at the north end of City Hall Park at the same time, being completed in 1881. Though the building had begun construction in 1861, work on the building stopped between 1872 and 1877 after the downfall of its patron Boss Tweed and the death of its primary architect.

By the 1880s, the city of New York was rapidly growing; the population had increased to more than a million residents, and the government was outgrowing its offices. The mayor, Franklin Edson, recognized the need for more space for government offices and was reluctant to add onto the original City Hall building. Instead, between the years of 1888 and 1907, the city organized a series of competitions to choose designs for several new structures.

On the western edge of the Civic Center, several buildings were completed in the 1890s. The first buildings to be completed were the Home Life and Postal Telegraph Buildings at Broadway and Murray Street, constructed simultaneously between 1892 and 1894, and later combined into one structure. Immediately to the north is the Rogers Peet Building, constructed in 1899 after a fire the previous year had razed its predecessor of the same name. In 1900, Cass Gilbert completed his first New York City design, the 18-story Broadway–Chambers Building at Broadway and Chambers Street.

On December 3, 1897, people rejoiced by City Hall in celebration of the consolidation of the Bronx, Brooklyn, Manhattan, Queens, and Staten Island into the City of Greater New York. The new New York City numbered more than 4.5 million residents.

== 20th century ==
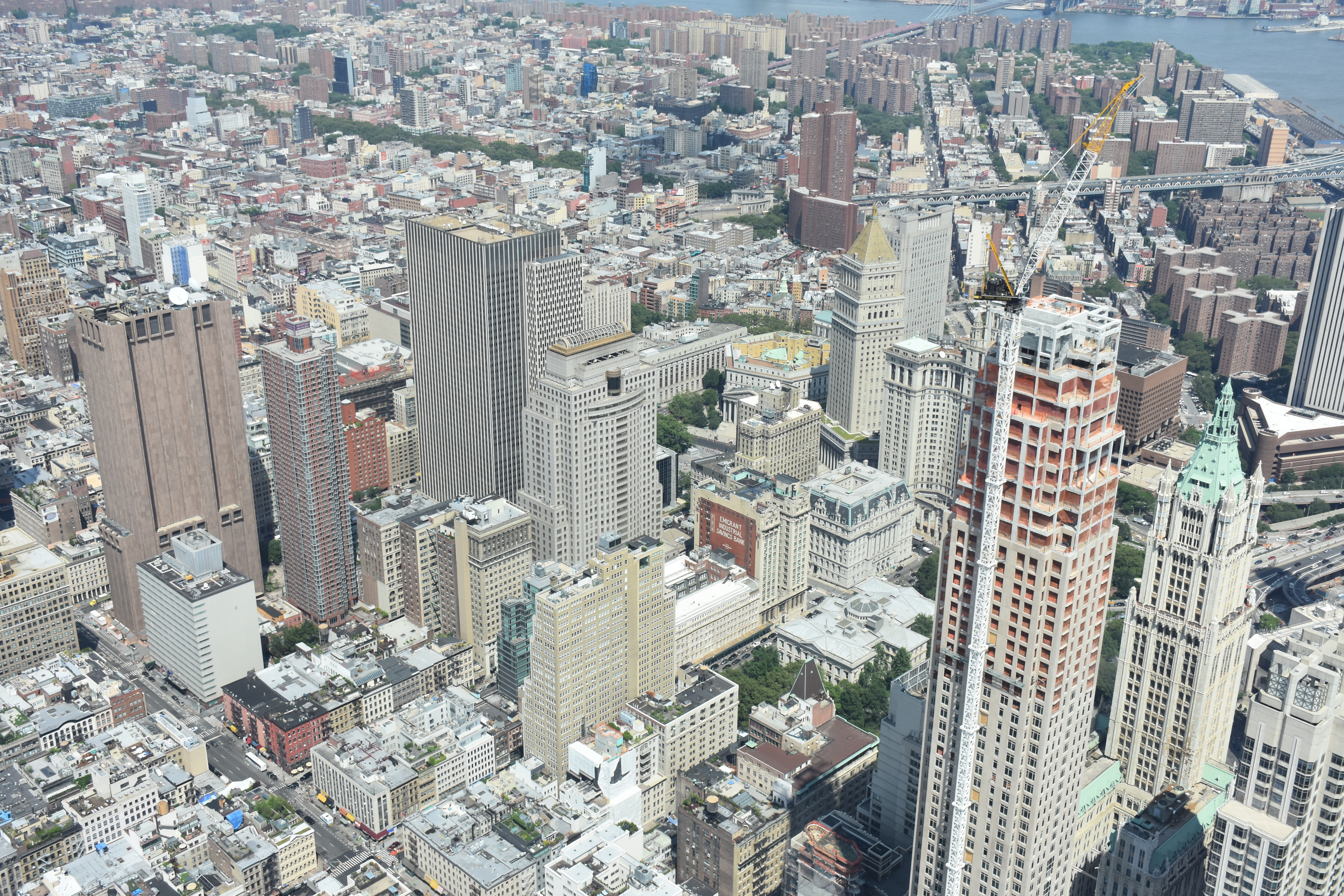
The Civic Center neighborhood seen from One World Observatory in June 2015

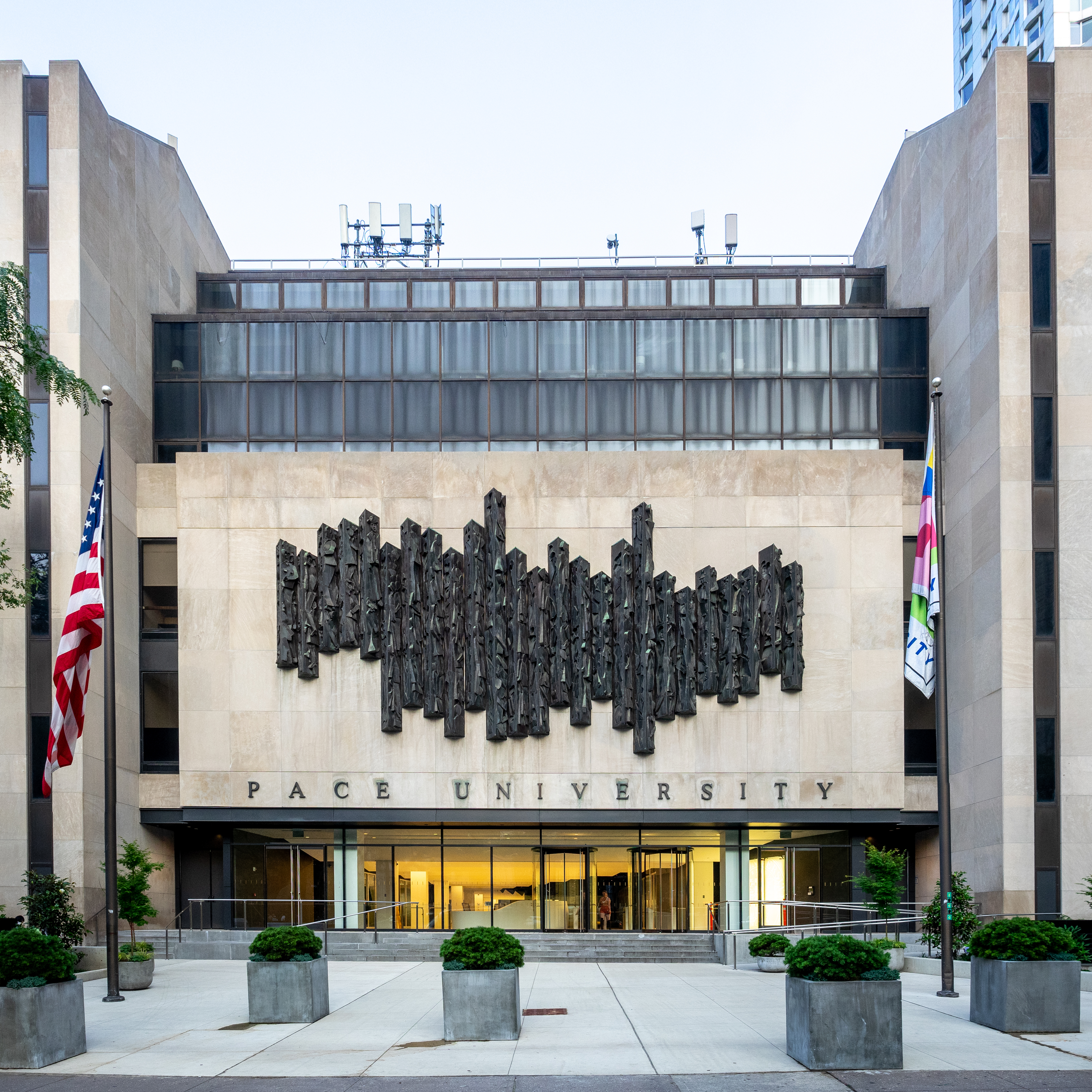
Pace University in the Civic Center neighborhood

Post-consolidation work on the New York City Subway's first line began in 1900, and the City Hall and Brooklyn Bridge stations opened in 1904. The Emigrant Savings Bank, a bank for Irish immigrants established at 51 Chambers Street in 1850, built the Emigrant Industrial Savings Bank Building on the site of their old headquarters between 1909 and 1912. Immediately to the east, the Surrogate's Courthouse, originally called the Hall of Records, was built between 1899 and 1907. The 40-story Municipal Building, at the intersection of Centre and Chambers Streets, was completed in 1914 and has a gilded Civic Fame statue on top of the tower.

In 1906, the Pace brothers founded the firm of Pace & Pace to operate their schools of accountancy and business. Taking a loan of $600, the Pace brothers rented a classroom on one of the floors of the New York Tribune Building. The school would later become Pace University.

The city continued to innovate, and in 1908, City Hall Park was renovated, and the old gaslights were replaced with electric ones.

The Gothic style Woolworth Building, at Broadway between Park Place and Barclay Street, was designed by Cass Gilbert for Frank Winfield Woolworth, the owner of the "five and dime" Woolworth's retail chain. Completed in 1913, the Woolworth Building was the tallest building in the world until 1930; its ornamentation gave it the nickname the "Cathedral of Commerce".

As early as 1915, Mekeel's Weekly Stamp News contained many advertisements for stamp dealers in Nassau Street. In the 1930s, stamp collecting became very popular, and Nassau Street was the center of New York City's "Stamp District", called its "Street of Stamps", with dozens of stamp and coin dealers along its short length. The Stamp Center Building was located at 116 Nassau Street, and the Subway Stamp Shop was located at 87 Nassau Street.

During the Great Depression, masses gathered in City Hall Park as a place to protest the government.

== Renovations ==
Under Mayor Fiorello La Guardia, Robert Moses unveiled an ambitious plan to renovate the park in the late 1930s. The plan called for the Federal Post Office to be torn down, but this plan was stopped due to opposition from city officials and community groups.

The Delacorte family donated the Shew Fountain. Twenty-one years later, Mayor Rudy Giuliani rededicated the park for 7.5 million dollars and removed the Shew Fountain.

In 1964, the government of New York City was authorized to buy several plots north of City Hall Park. The redevelopment plans were ultimately scrapped due to the 1975 New York City fiscal crisis, but the city retained ownership of the Emigrant Savings Bank Building.

Tweed Courthouse was renovated and redesigned between 1999 and 2001, becoming the Department of Education's headquarters in 2002. The former Emigrant Bank Building was converted into a condominium development called 49 Chambers in 2017.

== Usages ==
=== African Burial Ground ===
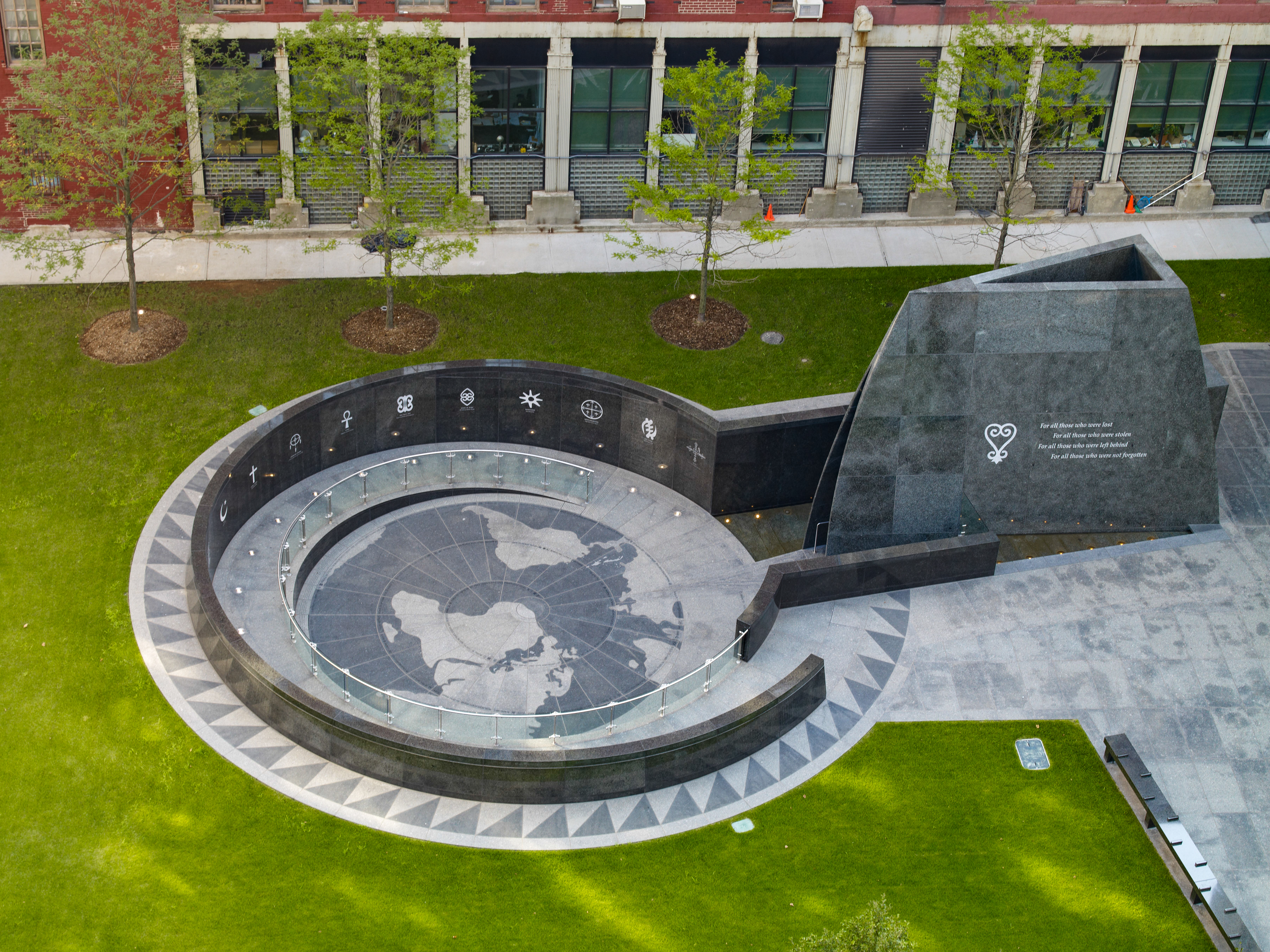
The African Burial Ground National Monument in Civic Center

In 1991, while constructing the Ted Weiss Federal Building, the excavators found thousands of graves. Scientists estimated that the land was the largest cemetery in the world for people of African descent, projecting that approximately 15,000 to 20,000 people were buried there, although only 420 bodies were excavated. The African Burial Ground National Monument was established, and a memorial site was constructed, opening in 2007. The visitor center was opened in 2010 and has a video on the discovery of the graves, sculptures of the burial process, and information on the lives of the slaves.

=== Newspaper publishing ===
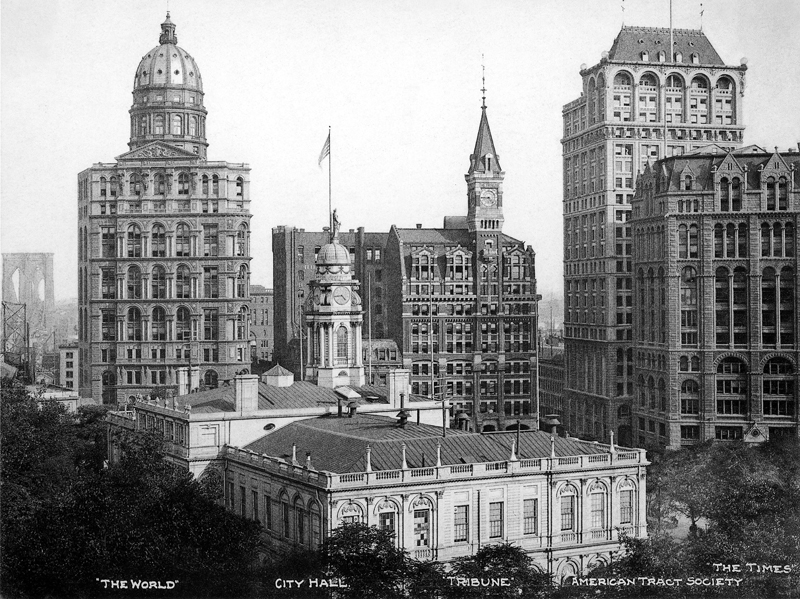
Newspaper Row prior to 1903 with the original New York Tribune Building in the center

A wave of newspaper companies arose in 1835 after the invention of the steam press, which turned out printed sheets mechanically, replacing the old hand-cranked method. The convenience of mass production generated a penny press and mass consumption of sensational news. The Civic Center was always a desirable location for newspapers because it was so close to City Hall and the courts, but the numbers increased exponentially after the invention of the steam press. Park Row became known as "Newspaper Row", and between the Civil War and World War I, 60 newspapers were published there.

The Sun began publication in 1833, as a morning newspaper edited by Benjamin Day with the slogan: "It Shines for All". The newspaper's offices, a converted A.T. Stewart department store at 280 Broadway, between Chambers and Duane Streets, is famous for the clocks that bear the newspaper's masthead and motto.

Horace Greeley created the New York Tribune in 1841 with the hopes of providing a straightforward, trustworthy media source in an era when newspapers such as The Sun and The New York Herald thrived on sensationalism. The Tribune's original building was located on 30 Ann Street, but was moved to the New York Tribune Building in 1875.

The New York Times' first building was located at 113 Nassau Street in lower Manhattan. In 1854, it moved to 138 Nassau Street, and in 1858 it moved to 41 Park Row, making it the first newspaper in New York City housed in a building built specifically for its use.

Frank Queen bought a small office on Nassau Street and began publishing the New York Clipper in 1853, making it the first American paper devoted entirely to entertainment; the paper eventually shortened its name to The Clipper. The paper was one of the earliest publications in the United States to regularly cover sports, and it played an important role in popularizing baseball in the country. In addition to more popular sporting events, the New York Clipper also wrote about billiards, bowling, and even chess. It began covering American football in 1880.

The New York World was founded in 1860 but was a relatively unsuccessful New York newspaper from 1860 to 1883. Joseph Pulitzer purchased it in 1883, and a new, aggressive era of circulation building began. In 1890, Pulitzer built the New York World Building, the tallest office building in the world at the time (it was razed in 1955).

The New York Journal was established in 1868, as a paper published every other day. The paper was barely financially stable and in 1895, William Randolph Hearst purchased it. He made major changes to the paper, and adopting the approach used by Joseph Pulitzer, he began competing with the New York World. Each publication would compete by fabricating and embellishing stories more than the other. They increased their title font sizes, and focused more on the title than the actual story.

The Revolution, also established in 1868, was a women's rights newspaper founded by Elizabeth Cady Stanton and Susan B. Anthony.

The New York Press was a New York City newspaper that began publication in December 1887 and published notable writers such as Stephen Crane. It also coined the term "yellow journalism" in early 1897, to refer to the work of Joseph Pulitzer's New York World and William Randolph Hearst's New York Journal.

The Daily People was a weekly newspaper established in New York City in 1891, and is best remembered as a vehicle for the ideas of Daniel DeLeon (1852–1914), the dominant ideological leader of the Socialist Labor Party of America.

=== Yellow journalism ===
The New York Press said, in 1898, about papers practicing "yellow journalism": it "We called them Yellow because they are Yellow."

The "yellow journalism" tactics used by the New York Journal and the New York World increased circulation and influenced the content and style of newspapers in most of the America's major cities. Many aspects of yellow journalism, such as banner headlines, sensational stories, an emphasis on illustrations, and colored supplements, became a permanent feature of popular newspapers in the United States and Europe during the 20th century.
