= Nicole Hollant-Denis =

American architect

- Born: c. 1970 (age c. 56); New York City, New York, United States
- Education: Cornell University (BA); Harvard University (MA)

Nicole Hollant-Denis (born c. 1970) is an American architect, founder, and principal of Aaris Design Studios. She is best known for her work on the African Burial Ground National Monument in New York City, for which she won the NOMA (National Organization of Minority Architects) Design Excellence Honor Award. Hollant-Denis's other projects include the redesign of La Marqueta Plaza in Harlem, New York.

== Early life and education ==
Hollant-Denis grew up in Brooklyn as a first generation American. Her parents immigrated from Haiti and Martinique. Her mother worked as a teacher at the Lyceum Kennedy, and her father was a TV repairman and the father of Haitian Americans United Progress (HAUP). She earned a Bachelor of Architecture degree from Cornell University and a Masters in Design from Harvard University.

== Career ==
African Burial Ground, New York, United States

After graduating from Cornell University in 1989, Hollant-Denis worked at the Port Authority of NY & NJ and then later went on to establish Aarris Architects in 2001.

In 2004, Hollant-Denis and Rodney Leon, her partner at Aarris Architects, won a competition to design the African Burial Ground National Monument in downtown Manhattan. The monument serves as a memorial to the around 20,000 enslaved and free Africans buried on the site between the 1690s and 1794. The monument was opened in February 2006 by president George W. Bush.

In 2019, she was the lead architect for the redesign of La Marqueta Plaza in Harlem, an open-air marketplace that re-imagines the urban public space.

Her Haiti House for Life, a prototype house done in collaboration with Taller Larjas, is a 2011 design for sustainable residential housing in Haiti.

== Awards and honors ==
- 2021 - 100 Women to Watch in Architecture
- 2019 - WBC - Women Builders Council - Outstanding Member
- 2015 - Haitian Round Table “Change Maker”
- 2015 - AIA Women's History Month Exhibit
- 2009 - Honor in Design Excellence, National Organization of Minority Architects, (NOMA)
