= Philip Martiny =

French-American sculptor (1858–1927)

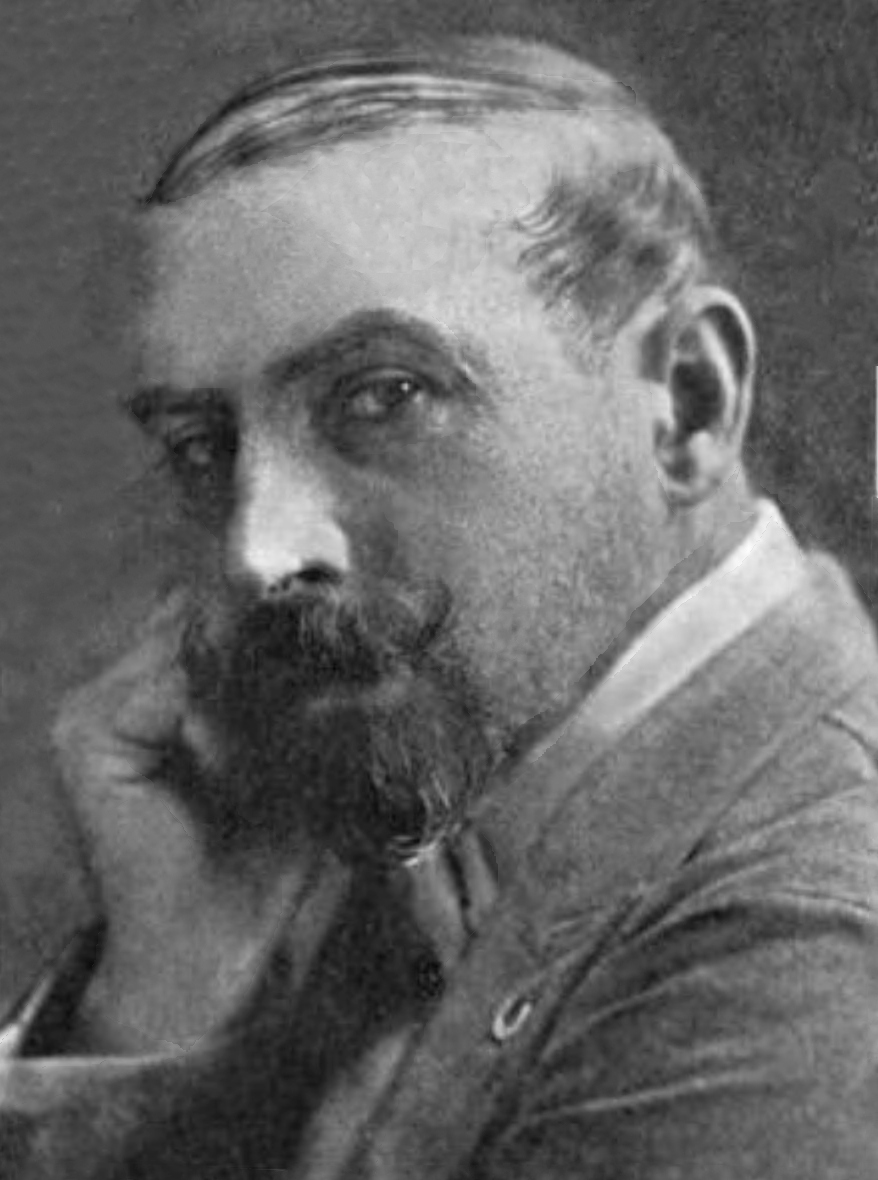
- Born: May 19, 1858; Strasbourg, France
- Died: June 26, 1927 (aged 69); New York City, New York, U.S.
- Occupation: Sculptor

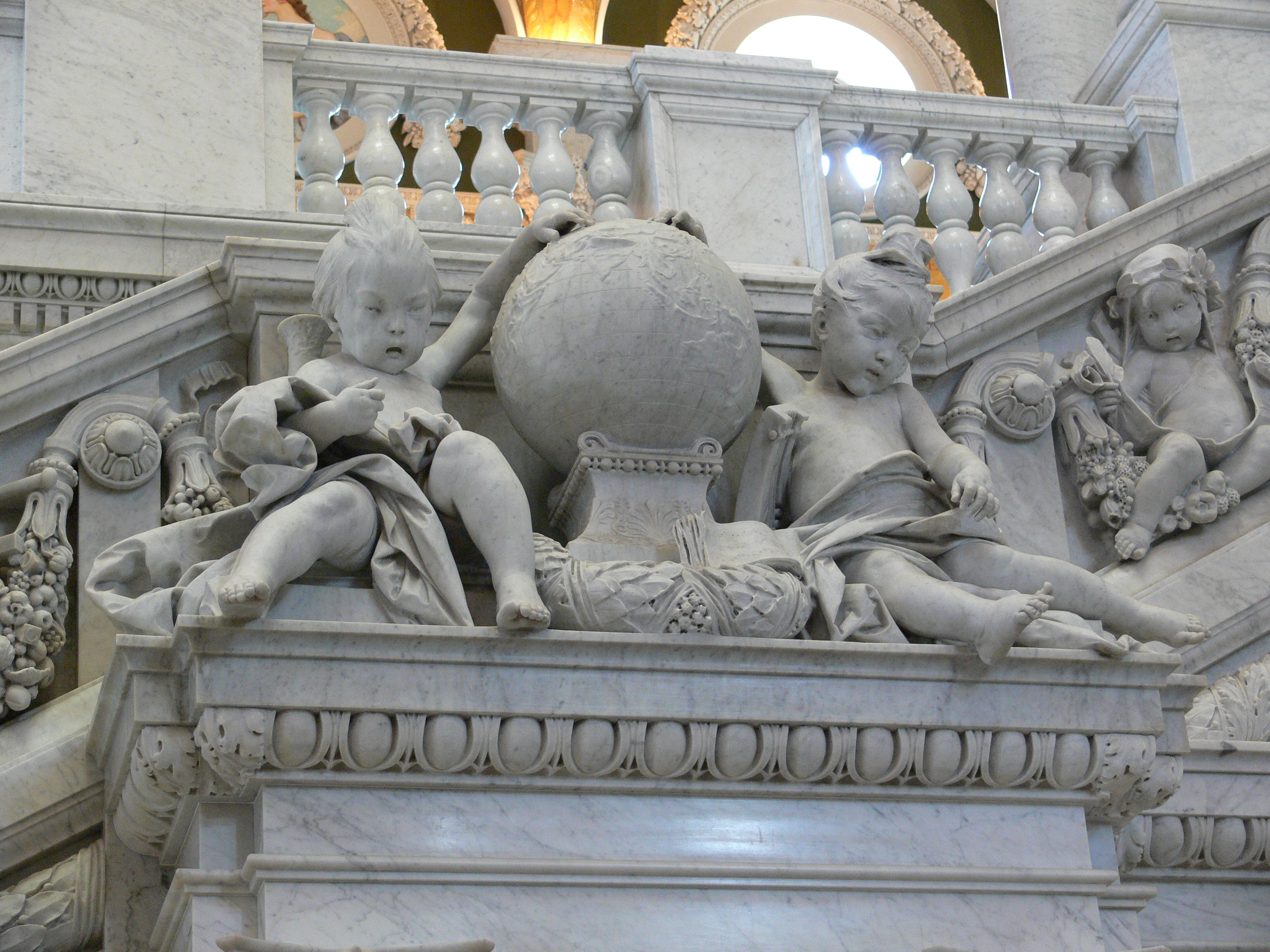
Putti representing Asia and Europe, Great Hall, Library of Congress

Philip H. Martiny (May 19, 1858 – June 26, 1927) was a French-American sculptor who worked in the Paris atelier of Eugene Dock, where he became foreman before emigrating to New York in 1878—to avoid conscription in the French army, he later claimed. In the United States he found work with Augustus Saint-Gaudens, with whom he remained five years; a fellow worker in Saint-Gaudens' shop was Frederick MacMonnies. A group photograph taken in Saint-Gaudens's studio about 1883, conserved in the Archives of American Art, shows Kenyon Cox, Richard Watson Gilder, Martiny, Francis Davis Millet, Saint-Gaudens, Julian Alden Weir and Stanford White.

He often worked in cooperation with architects in Beaux-Arts architecture. He lived in Bayside, Long Island, and had a sculpture studio in McDougal Alley, a fashionable former mews behind Washington Square Park. Much of his work is in New York City, though he provided bas-reliefs for the Art Institute of Chicago and for government buildings in Washington, DC. Martiny was one of the colony who gathered round Saint-Gaudens at Cornish, New Hampshire.

Martiny was one of the large team of decorative sculptors assembled to carry out details for the World's Columbian Exposition, Chicago, 1893, where he settled for a year to carry out the clay models for many somewhat facile decorative allegorical figures, cherubs, caryatids and the like. Karl Bitter diplomatically characterised Martiny's technique:

He works with incredible rapidity and apparently with little reflection, but always with such an instinct for the right thing, decoratively speaking, that he rarely fails in his results

The sculptures, which were carried out in staff, a weather-resistant plaster, were destroyed with the exhibition buildings, but the successful effect they produced led to further similar commissions at the Pan-American Exposition in Buffalo, New York (1901) and the Louisiana Purchase Exposition in St Louis (1904). His growing reputation led to his only medal, an award medal for the 1895 Cotton States and International Exposition in Atlanta, Georgia.

Though he was a member of the National Sculpture Society, Philip Martiny was not considered by his contemporaries as a sculptor of the first rank, and the assignation to him by the Tammany Hall architects given the plum project of completing designs for the New York City Hall of Records (later the Surrogate's Court) after the architect John R. Thomas's unexpected death in 1901, raised objections that tested the New York Art Commission's authority to accept or reject sculpture by Henry Kirke Bush-Brown and Martiny for the building. Daniel Chester French was called in to offer suggestions for improved subjects which Martiny finished in 1907.

In the midst of the project Martiny was interviewed for The New York Times giving the first impression that Martiny operated a commercial sculpture factory "where Art rubs elbows cheerfully, indiscriminately, with Life's less romantic work" but ending with admiration for the sculptor's likeness of the late President McKinley.

After the First World War, Martiny received two commissions for colossal figures commemorating the fallen soldiers: the Chelsea Park Memorial, at 28th Street and 9th Avenue and the memorial in Abingdon Square Park, where 8th Avenue commences.

Martiny married twice and had eight children. A debilitating stroke ended his career, and a second one finished his life. His papers, compiled by Martiny's grandson, Raymond J. Linder, are conserved in the Archives of American Art, The Smithsonian Institution.

== Selected works ==
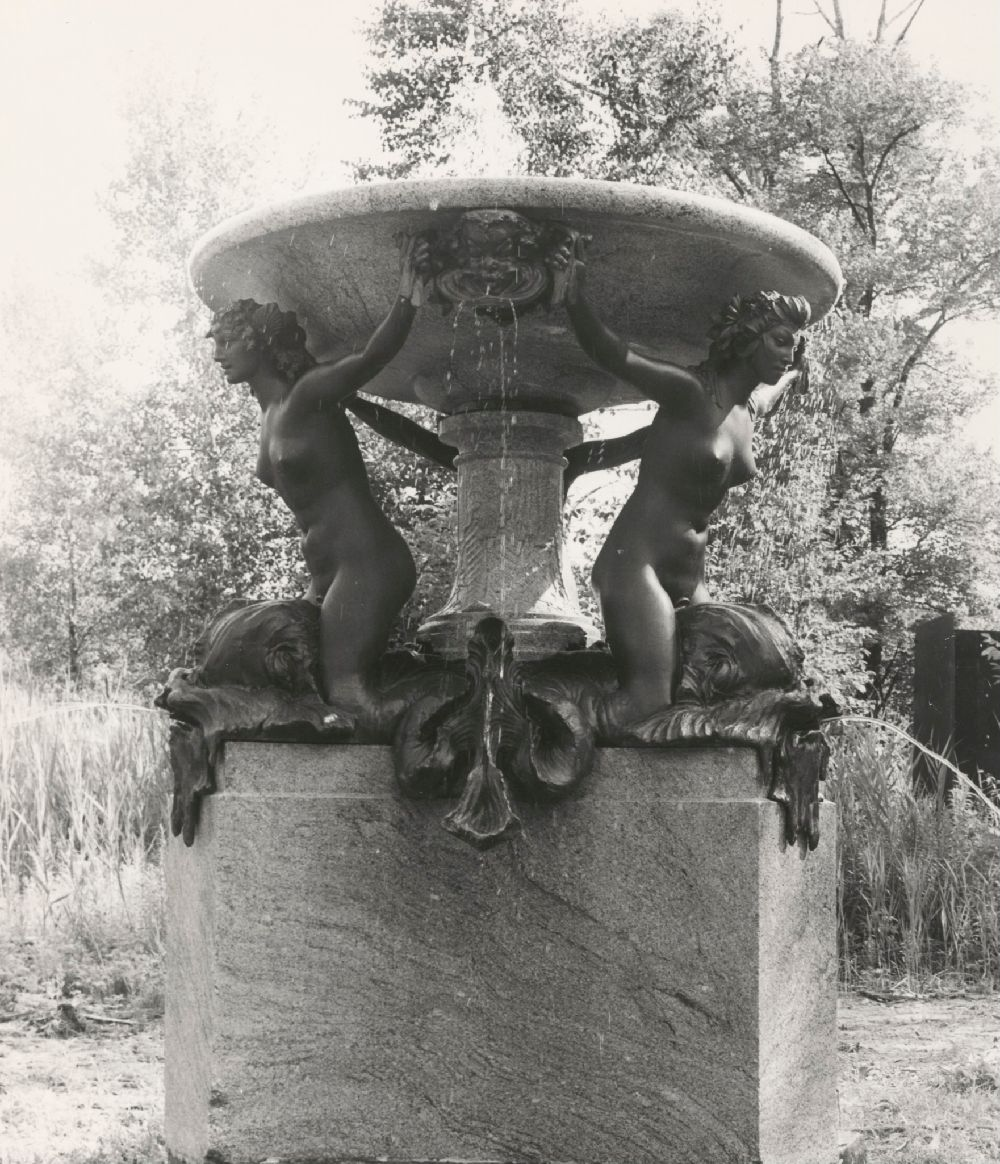
Philip Martiny, The Three Continents Fountain, 1914-1916, photo by David Finn, ©David Finn Archive, Department of Image Collections, National Gallery of Art Library, Washington, DC

An extensive list of Martiny's executed commissions, is on-line at National Museum of American Art, Smithsonian Research Information. System.

- New York City Hall of Records, Chambers and Centre Streets. Allegorical figures, under the executant architects Horgan and Slattery. 1901-07.
- Louisiana Purchase Exposition (The St Louis World's Fair), 1904. Seven allegorical groups.
- William McKinley Memorial, Springfield, Massachusetts.
- Life Publishing Company Building, 19 West 31st Street (now the Herald Square Hotel). Gilded figure of Winged Life in a rococo cartouche over the entrance, flanked by emblems of art and literature.
- St. Bartholomew's Episcopal Church, New York. Models for the bronze north doors, cast by the Henri-Bonnard Bronze Company.
- Library of Congress, Jefferson Building. Sculptural programs, in bronze and marble, of the two grand staircases flanking the Great Hall.
- Doughboy statues. Martiny used the same model for two statues that each depicted a World War I soldier, one to be erected in Chelsea Park and the other in Greenwich Village.
- The Three Continents Fountain, commissioned in 1914 by Herbert L. Pratt for his Long Island estate.
