= Church of the Good Shepherd (Lynchburg, Virginia) =

Historic church in Virginia, US

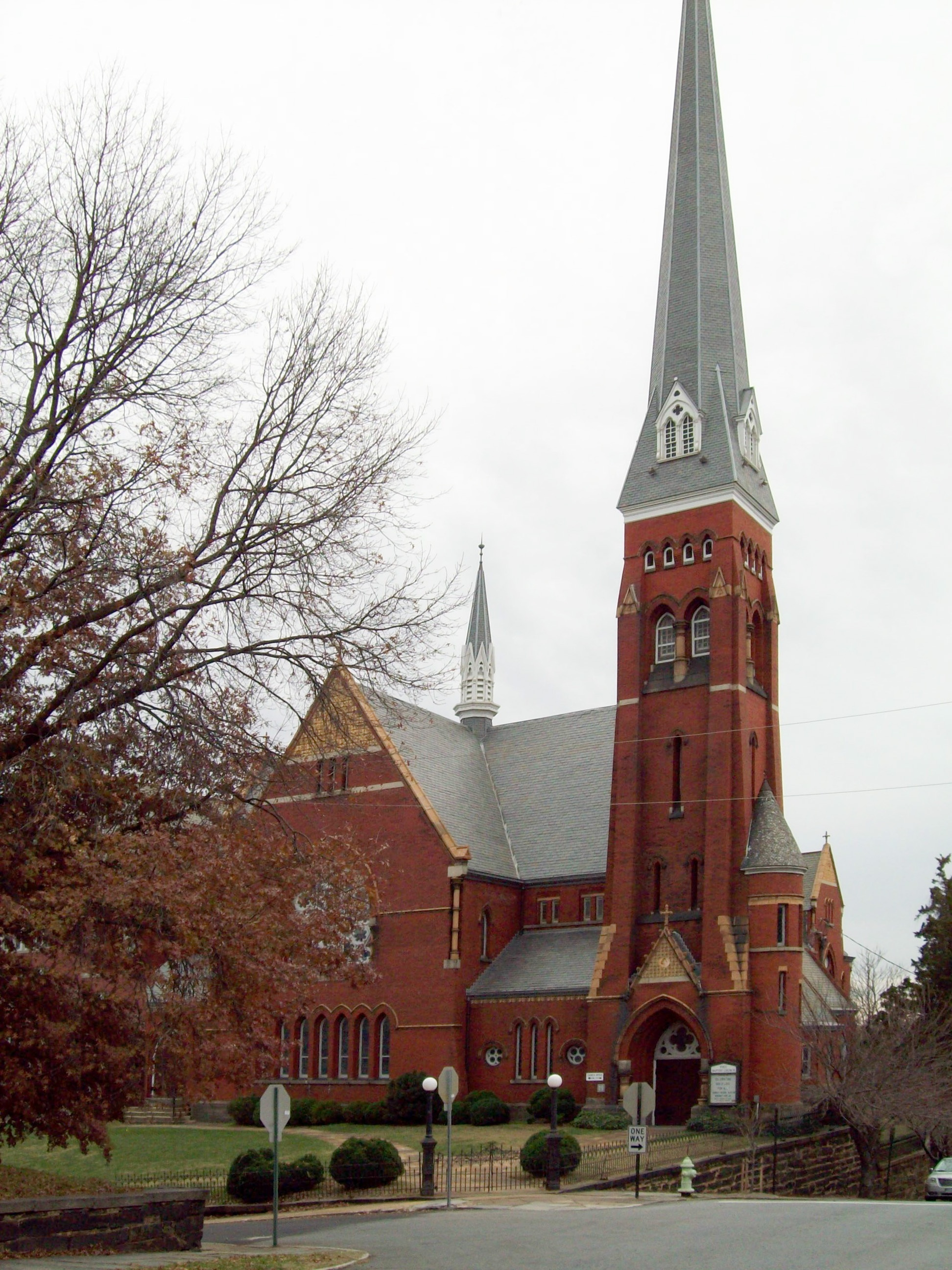
- The Church of the Good Shepherd pictured in 2008
- Church of the Good Shepherd
- 37°24′43″N 79°8′33″W
- Location: 1100 Court St., Lynchburg, Virginia
- Country: United States
- Denomination: Anglican Church in North America
- Website: goodshepherdlynchburg.com

History
- Founded: 2011
- Dedicated: 1886

Architecture
- Architect(s): John R. Thomas; Stanhope Johnson
- Style: Gothic Revival
- Years built: 1884

Administration
- Diocese: Mid-Atlantic

Clergy
- Rector: The Rev. Mike Kunzinger
- First Baptist Church
- U.S. National Register of Historic Places
- U.S. Historic district – Contributing property
- Virginia Landmarks Register
- Area: 1 acre (0.40 ha)
- NRHP reference No.: 82004570
- VLR No.: 118-0025

Significant dates
- Added to NRHP: September 9, 1982
- Designated VLR: April 21, 1981

The Church of the Good Shepherd (formerly known as First Baptist Church) is a historic Gothic Revival church located at 1100 Court Street, Lynchburg, Virginia.

== Architecture ==
The church is built of hard-pressed red brick on a rough granite foundation. The main facade of the church, facing Eleventh Street, and the two sides are centered with large rose windows framed within Gothic arches covered with hood moldings. It was listed on the National Register of Historic Places in 1982. It is also a contributing property to the Court House Hill-Downtown Historic District.

== History ==
Construction on First Baptist Church began in 1884 and the church was dedicated in 1886. In the 1920s, Lynchburg architect Stanhope S. Johnson designed the complementary Sunday School annex. In 1941, the interior of the sanctuary was modified by Johnson, with the creation of a divided chancel.

The building was home to the oldest Baptist congregation of Lynchburg, established in July 1815. In October 2024, the building was given to the Church of the Good Shepherd, a 2011 church plant of the Anglican Church in North America. Church of the Good Shepherd had begun meeting in the building in 2022. Church of the Good Shepherd's average Sunday attendance grew from 50 in 2016 to 181 in 2025.

== Ministries ==
Church of the Good Shepherd ministries include a Sunday school for nearly 75 infants and school-age children as well as vacation Bible school. The parish also hosts an Anglican Student Fellowship chapter at nearby Liberty University.
