= New York City Municipal Archives =

DoRIS division in Manhattan

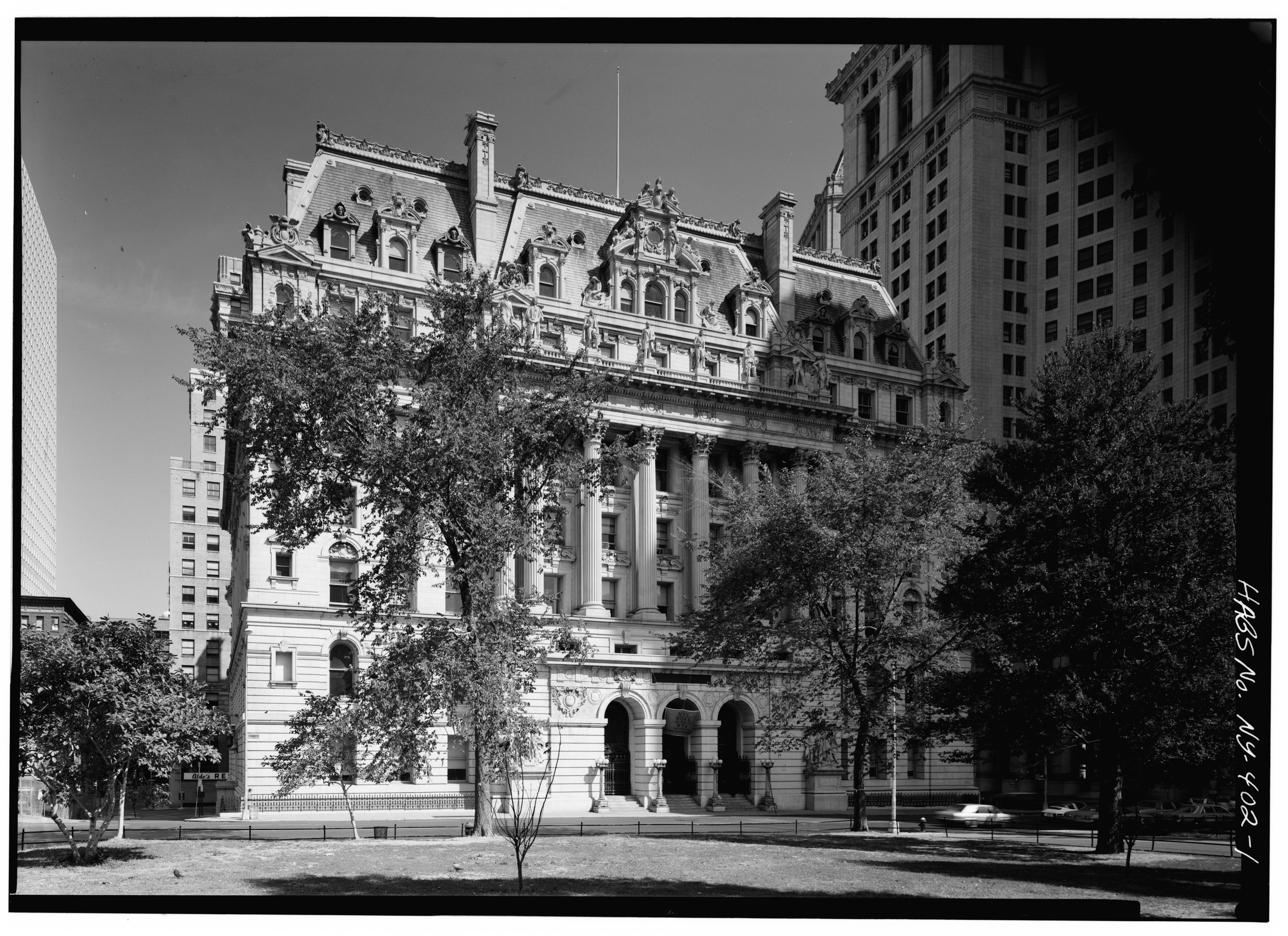
- Surrogate's Courthouse, location of the Municipal Archives
- 40°42′48.7″N 74°0′15.5″W
- Location: 31 Chambers Street; Room 103; New York, NY 10007, United States
- Type: Archive
- Scope: New York City
- Established: 1950

Collection
- Size: 160,000 cubic feet (4,500 m^{3})

Other information
- Director: Sylvia Kollar
- Website: nyc.gov/records

The New York City Municipal Archives (NYCMA) is a division of the New York City Department of Records and Information Services, located in the Surrogate's Courthouse in Manhattan. Founded in 1950, the Municipal Archives preserves and makes accessible records created by the government of New York City (including the mayor's office, city agencies, the City Council, the Comptroller, borough presidents and the Public Advocate). The collections include manuscripts, sound recordings, film and tape footage, maps, blueprints, photographs and digital media.

== Genealogy and family history ==
The New York City Municipal Archives preserves and makes available more than 10 million historical vital records (birth, marriage and death certificates) for all five boroughs (Manhattan, Brooklyn, the Bronx, Queens and Staten Island). Researchers have open access to the indexes, and both microfilmed and digital copies of vital records on-site in the Municipal Library and Archives Reference Room. Copies of vital records can be ordered through the Department of Records and Information Services.

== Municipal Archive units ==
The Municipal Archives consists of four units to ensure the multi-format collections created by New York City Government are acquired, described, preserved and made publicly accessible. They are:

- Appraisals and Accessions unit works with the Department's Records Management Division to formally acquire city records with historical, cultural or other value.
- Collections Management unit implements the core stewardship standards for maintaining a records depository through industry-standard descriptions and access tools.
- Conservation and Preservation unit ensures environmental and physical actions are taken to anticipate, prevent, reduce or halt the deterioration of library and archival materials. The unit manages a professional paper conservation lab.
- Digital Programs unit manages the digital infrastructure and implements the policies and workflows for digitized and born-digital materials.

== Collections ==
The archives’ collections consist of more than 200,000 cubic feet and 185 TB of digital records in the Surrogate's Courthouse. Highlights include documents from the first Dutch colonial government in New Amsterdam, the most comprehensive collection of records pertaining to the administration of criminal justice in the English-speaking world, two centuries of mayoral papers, the architectural plans for construction of Central Park and the Brooklyn Bridge, and a nationally recognized collection of public education records. The online portal offers 1.6 million images including pictures of every house and building in the city dating from 1940 and 1985.

=== Internal collections ===
- Artifacts and Memorial Collections of the World Trade Center Attack on September 11, 2001
- Almshouse, 1758-1953
- Assessed Valuation of Real Estate, 1789–1979
- Board of Education, 1842-2002
- Brooklyn Bridge, 1867–1938
- Department of Buildings, 1866–1975
- Census
- City Cemetery, 1881-1950s
- City Council, 1647–1977
- Civil List, 1883-1967/68
- Coroner and Office of Chief Medical Examiner, 1823–1950
- Court Records, 1684–1966
- District Attorney Records, 1895–1971
- Genealogy, 1795-1948
- Mayors, 1849-present
- New Amsterdam Records, 1647-1862
- New York County Court of General Sessions Grand Jury Indictments, 1879–1893
- "Old Towns," 1663–1898
- Department of Parks, 1850–1960
- Website of Mayor Bloomberg, 2002–2013
- Website of Mayor Giuliani, 1994–2001
- WNYC, 1936-198 1 and WNYC
- WPA Federal Writers' Project (NYC Unit), 1936–1943

The Municipal Archives presents several exhibits each year. Recent exhibits include Feeding the city: The Unpublished WPA manuscript; Unlikely Historians showcasing materials collected by the New York City Police Department while conducting surveillance between 1960 and 1975; and Little Syria, presented in cooperation with the Arab American National Museum.

The Archives has developed various projects to engage non-traditional audiences including participation in Photoville on an annual basis, gathering community stories from residents of City neighborhoods, and sponsoring a five-year celebration of American women winning suffrage.
