= Eastern Correctional Facility =

State prison for men in New York, US

Coordinates: 41°44′29″N 74°21′47″W

- Interactive map of Eastern Correctional Facility
- Location: 30 Institution Road Napanoch, New York
- Status: open
- Security class: maximum
- Capacity: 1100
- Opened: 1900
- Managed by: New York State Department of Corrections and Community Supervision

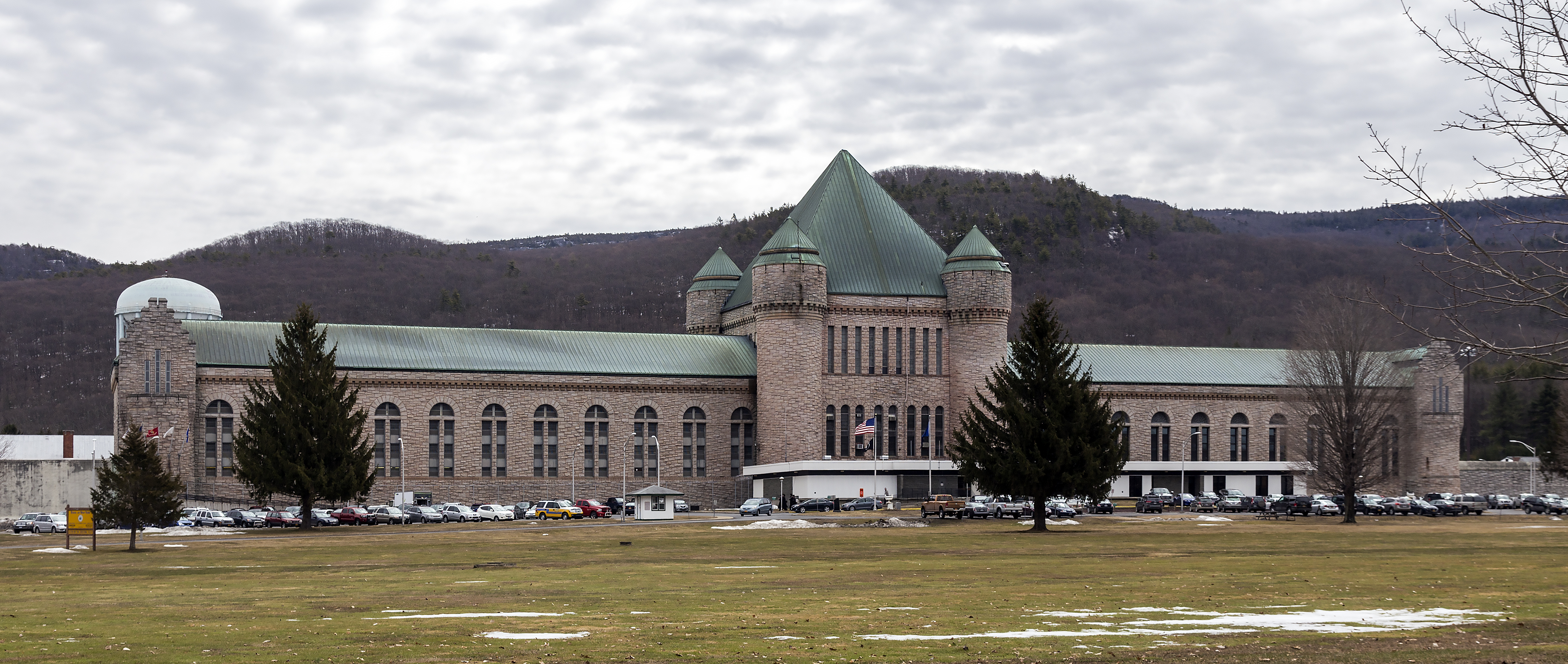
Eastern Correctional Facility in 2015

The Eastern Correctional Facility is a New York state prison for men in Napanoch, Ulster County. Its imposing main building, with medieval-style turrets and long green copper roof, was designed by architect John Rochester Thomas.

Operated by New York State Department of Corrections and Community Supervision, Eastern has been a maximum security prison for men since 1973. The correctional facility is one of the oldest in the state.

At various times the facility was designated as the "Institute for Defective and Delinquent Men at Napanoch", "State Institution for Male Defective Delinquents", and the "Catskill Reformatory".

== History ==
The site opened as the Eastern New York Reformatory. It was chosen partly for its easily available stone, and the transport provided by the adjacent Delaware and Hudson Canal; able-bodied adult prisoners were imported for construction labor. Architect, Rochester Thomas also designed Elmira Correctional Facility. The first Building Commissioner for the Correctional facility was New York State Assembly Democrat, George H. Bush. He was appointed in 1894.

Years later it achieved its capacity of 500 beds. In 1921 Eastern became the first of the institutions for defective delinquents in the United States.

The state's Ulster Correctional Facility was built on Eastern's grounds in 1990.
