= Squadron A =

- Squadron A Association Logo
- Formation: 1889
- Legal status: active
- Purpose: to continue, preserve and forward the traditions, memory and contributions of Squadron A and the Horse Cavalry.
- Location: 3 West 51 Street, Manhattan, New York City, U.S.
- Official language: English
- President: Michael D. Witter
- Website: squadrona.org

Squadron A refers to the historic cavalry unit of New York City's Upper East Side.

Squadron A originated with a group of wealthy young gentlemen with great interest in equestrian sport who formed themselves into a group called the "New York Hussars". They adopted blue uniforms and headgear for ceremonial purposes that mimicked Eurasian fashions dating back to the Napoleonic and Crimean Wars. In an effort to become more professional and militarized, they extended membership to Captain Charles Francis Roe, 20-year veteran of the US Army Cavalry, who inspired its membership with the cavalry spirit and military discipline. His efforts were successful to the point that in 1889 53 men were mustered into the New York State National Guard as Troop A, becoming the cavalry arm of the Empire State. Squadron A was officially founded.

== History ==
=== World War I and II ===
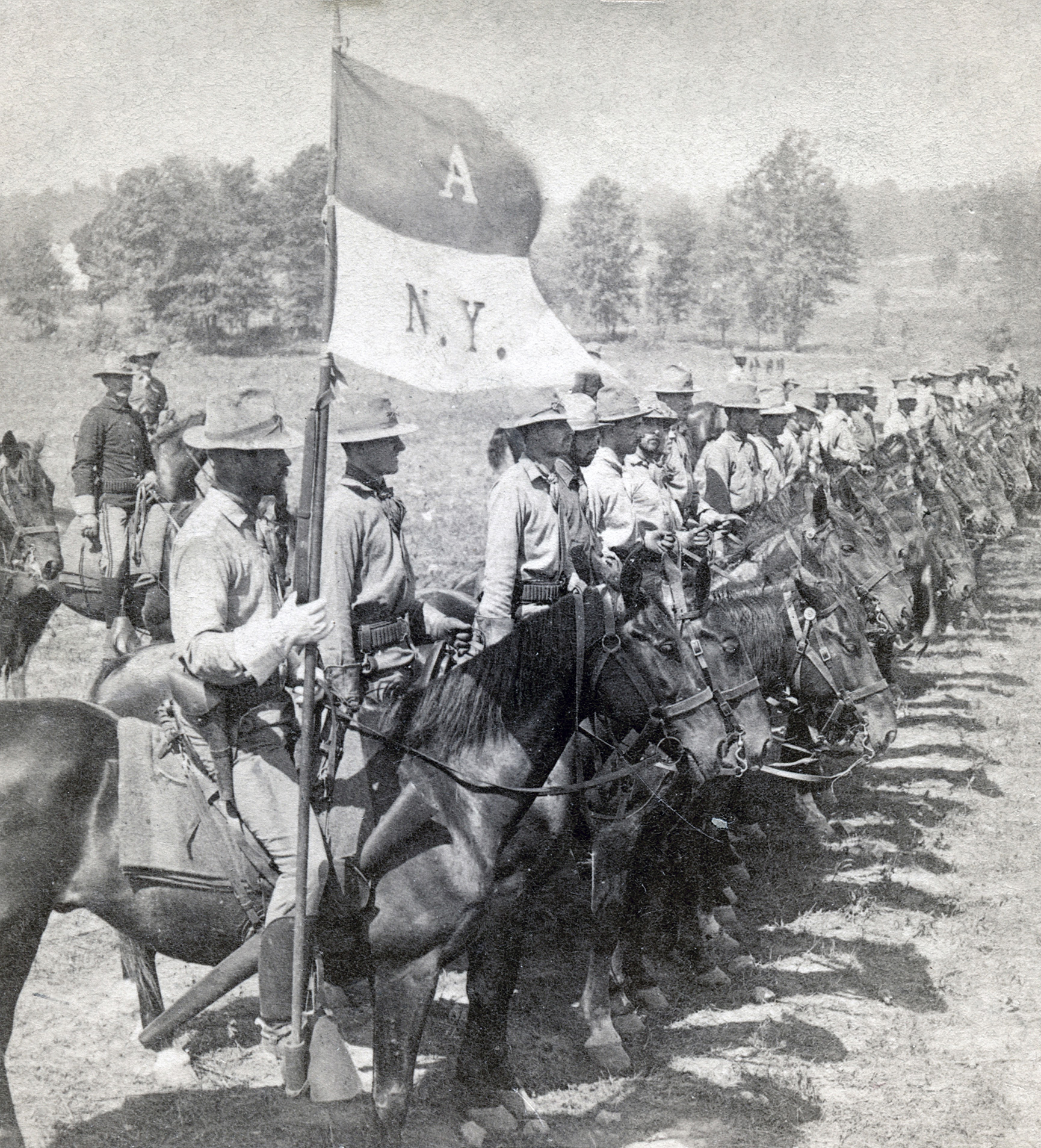
Troop A, Volunteer Cavalry from New York City at Camp Alger, in Falls Church, Virginia, in 1898

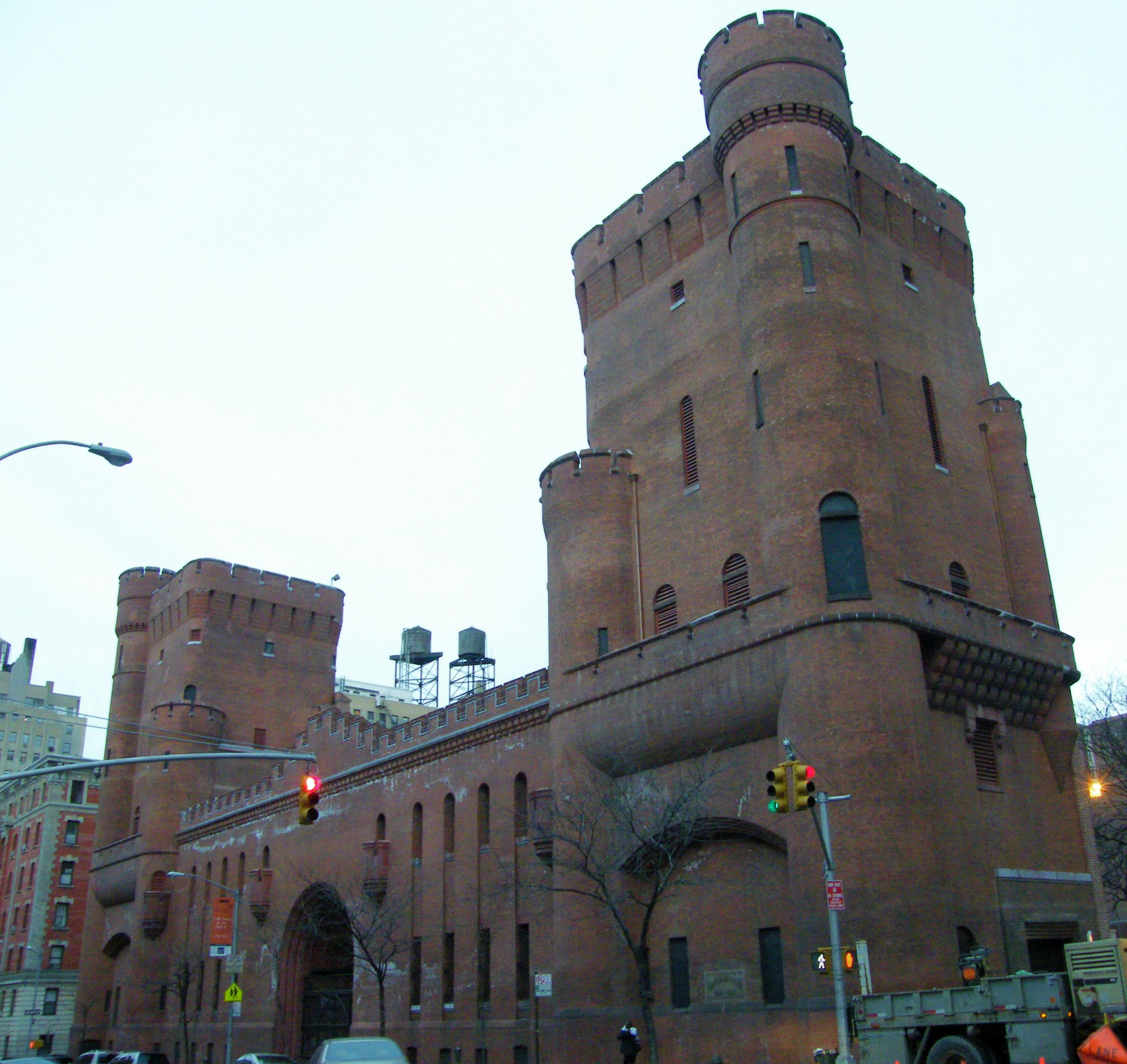
Squadron A Armory on Madison Avenue in 2010

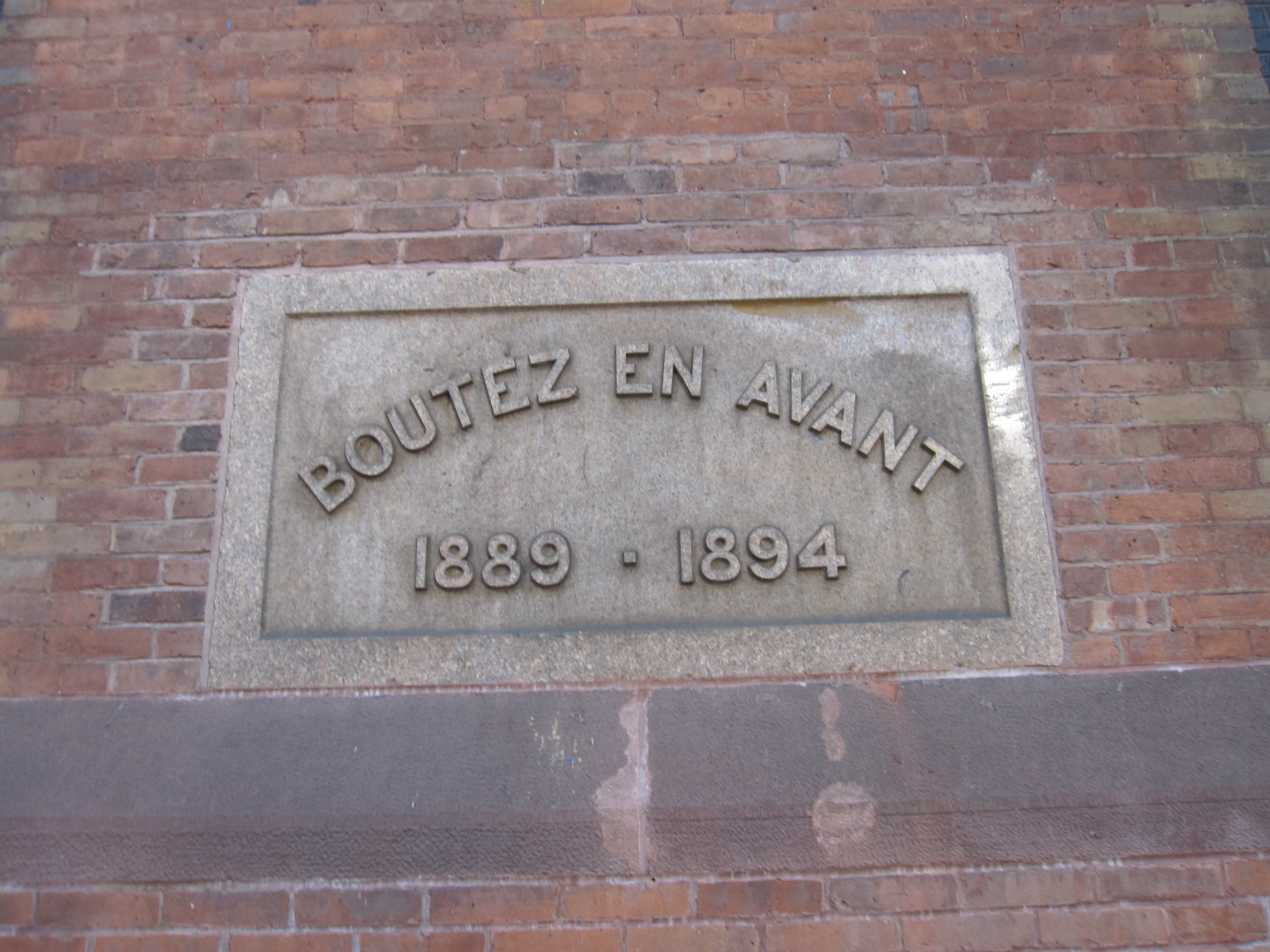
The squadron's cry "Boutez en avant!" on the Madison Avenue Armory

Squadron A was often called out from its Madison Avenue Armory, which occupied an entire city block between 94th and 95th Streets, to escort presidents, governors, and foreign dignitaries. The Squadron was known for its fine riding skills and elegant uniforms, which it showed off in parades at the National Horse Show.

Members of Squadron served as soldiers as well. Volunteer Squadron A troopers served in the Puerto Rican Campaign in 1898, and in 1916 the entire Squadron was called into federal service to patrol the Mexican Border and to support the Pancho Villa Expedition.

During World War I, 796 Squadron A members served, and 609 became commissioned officers. As part of the 105th Machine Gun Battalion, the Squadron played an important role in the smashing of the Hindenburg Line. Members were highly decorated, including a Medal of Honor recipient.

In World War II, the unit was federalized as the 101st Cavalry, Horse/Mechanized in early 1941. Following the Attack on Pearl Harbor on December 7, 1941, Squadron A men served in all branches of the armed forces worldwide, and two additional Medals of Honor and other distinctions were awarded.

=== Social activities ===
In peacetime between the wars and after their ending, the Squadron was the focus of active social life. Aside from official ceremonial duties, there was indoor polo in the Armory every Saturday night followed by a black tie-dance and many Sunday afternoon tea dances.

The 94th Street Armory came down in 1965, but its façade, with the Squadron motto BOUTEZ EN AVANT (Charge!) plaque is still intact, and the Hunter College High School building now occupying the rest of the block takes its architectural cues from the original Armory design.

Squadron A memorabilia is maintained in a museum at the Staten Island armory of the 101st Cavalry (Tank), NYARNG, the successor unit to the Squadron, at 321 Manor Road, Castleton Corners, Staten Island. The 101st was one of the first military units to respond to the September 11 attacks, aiding both citizens and police, and have been mobilized in support of both the War in Afghanistan and the War in Iraq.

The spirit and traditions of the Squadron A are maintained by the Squadron A Association, housed in the Women's National Republican Club building on 51st Street in Manhattan. Colonel Robert L. McClean, USAR (ret.) was president of the Association until he died in 2011. The Association has more than 700 resident and non-resident members. The Squadron A Association maintains an active social agenda with an annual day at the Belmont Racetrack, an annual Memorial Service at the Church of the Heavenly Rest in Manhattan with reception, and a Christmas cocktail party. Additional events have included a Cavalry ball, visits aboard an aircraft carrier during Armed Forces Week, West Point football outings, and polo and shooting parties.

== Distinguished members ==
- C. P. H. Gilbert, architect from New York
- Karl Frederick, 1920 Olympic competitor and president of the National Rifle Association
- Guy Sands-Pingot, Brigadier General, USAR
- Fred Thrower, Navy Lieutenant, USN, and New York television executive who created the Yule Log (TV program)
- Edgar A. Knapp, Rough Rider, 1st Vol Cavalry Cuba
- Christopher Ross, sculptor, designer and collector from New York
- Frederic René Coudert, II, international lawyer from New York
