= Surrogate's Courthouse =

Historic courthouse in Manhattan, New York

- Surrogate's Court
- U.S. National Register of Historic Places
- U.S. National Historic Landmark
- New York State Register of Historic Places
- New York City Landmark
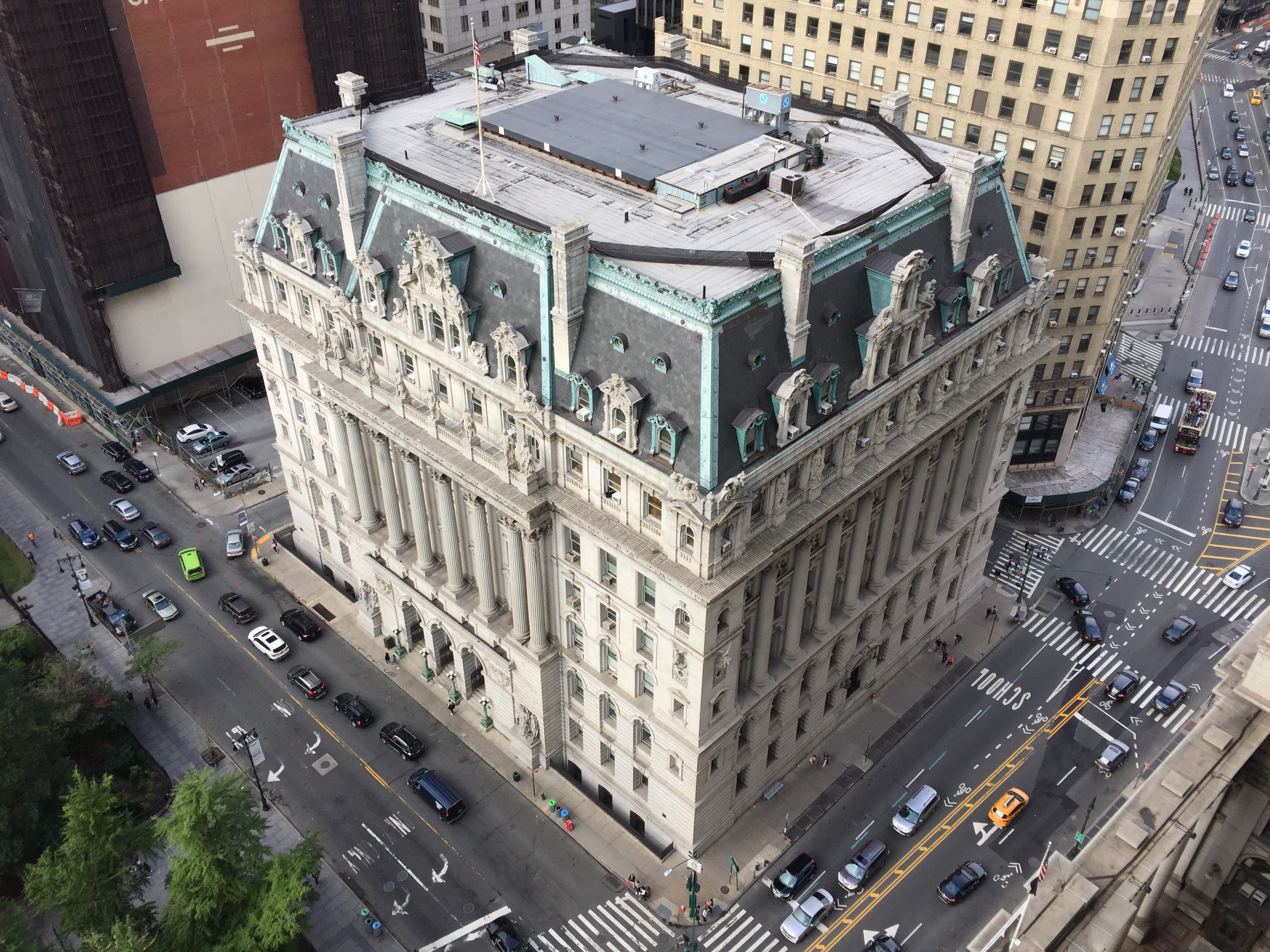
- View from the Manhattan Municipal Building

- Location within Lower Manhattan Location within New York City Location within New York Location within the United States
- Interactive map of Surrogate's Court
- Location: 31 Chambers Street; Manhattan, New York, U.S.
- Coordinates: 40°42′49″N 74°00′16″W
- Built: 1899–1907
- Architect: John Rochester Thomas; Arthur J. Horgan and Vincent J. Slattery
- Architectural style: Beaux Arts
- NRHP reference No.: 72000888
- NYSRHP No.: 06101.000420
- NYCL No.: 0082, 0926

Significant dates
- Added to NRHP: January 29, 1972
- Designated NHL: December 22, 1977
- Designated NYSRHP: June 23, 1980
- Designated NYCL: February 15, 1966 (exterior); May 11, 1976 (interior)

The Surrogate's Courthouse (also the Hall of Records and 31 Chambers Street) is a historic building at the northwest corner of Chambers and Centre Streets in the Civic Center of Manhattan in New York City, New York, U.S. Completed in 1907, it was designed in the Beaux Arts style. John Rochester Thomas created the original plans while Arthur J. Horgan and Vincent J. Slattery oversaw the building's completion. The building faces City Hall Park and the Tweed Courthouse to the south, as well as the Manhattan Municipal Building to the east.

The Surrogate's Courthouse is a seven-story steel-framed structure with a granite facade and elaborate marble interiors. The architects used a fireproof frame so the structure could safely accommodate the city's paper records. The exterior is decorated with 54 sculptures by Philip Martiny and Henry Kirke Bush-Brown, as well as three-story colonnades with Corinthian columns along Chambers and Reade Streets. The basement houses the New York City Municipal Archives. The fifth floor contains the New York Surrogate's Court for New York County, which handles probate and estate proceedings for the New York State Unified Court System.

The Hall of Records building had been planned since the late 19th century to replace an outdated building in City Hall Park; plans for the current building were approved in 1897. Construction took place between 1899 and 1907, having been subject to several delays because of controversies over funding, sculptures, and Horgan and Slattery's involvement after Thomas's death in 1901. Renamed the Surrogate's Courthouse in 1962, the building has undergone few alterations over the years. The Surrogate's Courthouse is listed on the National Register of Historic Places as a National Historic Landmark, and its facade and interior are both New York City designated landmarks.

== Site ==
The Surrogate's Courthouse is in the Civic Center neighborhood of Manhattan in New York City, New York, U.S., just north of City Hall Park. It occupies an entire city block bounded by Chambers Street to the south, Centre Street to the east, Reade Street to the north, and Elk Street to the west. The site measures about 191 by 152 feet (58 by 46 m). Other nearby buildings and locations include 49 Chambers and 280 Broadway to the west; the Ted Weiss Federal Building and African Burial Ground National Monument to the northwest; the Thurgood Marshall United States Courthouse to the northeast; the Manhattan Municipal Building to the east; and the Tweed Courthouse and New York City Hall to the southwest, within City Hall Park.

The ground slopes downward from south to north; the original ground elevation was below Reade Street and close to sea level. The surrounding area contains evidence of the interments of individuals, mostly of African descent, but the foundations of the Surrogate's Courthouse may have destroyed any remnants of corpses on the site. In the 18th and early 19th centuries, the Surrogate's Courthouse site was on a hill called "Pot Baker's" or "Potter's Hill", so named because several families in the pottery industry lived or worked nearby. The site also included a water reservoir built of stone and maintained by the Manhattan Company from 1799 until 1842, when the Croton Aqueduct opened. In the mid-19th century, the site contained small loft buildings, including the former home and office of Aaron Burr on Reade Street. Before the completion of Elk Street in 1901, (Note: Elk Street was named Elm Street prior to 1939.) the site was part of a larger city block bounded by Broadway and Chambers, Centre, and Reade Streets.

== Architecture ==
The Surrogate's Courthouse was designed in the Beaux-Arts style. John Rochester Thomas, the original architect, died in 1901; Arthur J. Horgan and Vincent J. Slattery oversaw the completion of Thomas's plan. Their relatively unknown firm had connections to the politically powerful Tammany Hall organization of the time. The final design largely conforms to Thomas's original plans, though Horgan and Slattery were mostly responsible for the sculptural ornamentation. Fay Kellogg, who designed the prominent double staircase in the building's lobby, helped prepare plans for the Hall of Records. The building has undergone relatively few alterations since its completion in 1907.

The Surrogate's Courthouse's seven-story granite facade wraps around the building's structural frame, while the interiors are elaborately designed in marble. The frame incorporated fireproof material so the building could safely house the city's paper records. The interior spaces are popular with film and television production companies and have been used in many commercials, TV series, and movies. Besides housing the Surrogate's Court for New York County, the building contains the New York City Municipal Archives, the New York City Department of Records and Information Services' (DORIS) City Hall Library, and the New York City Department of Cultural Affairs.

=== Facade ===
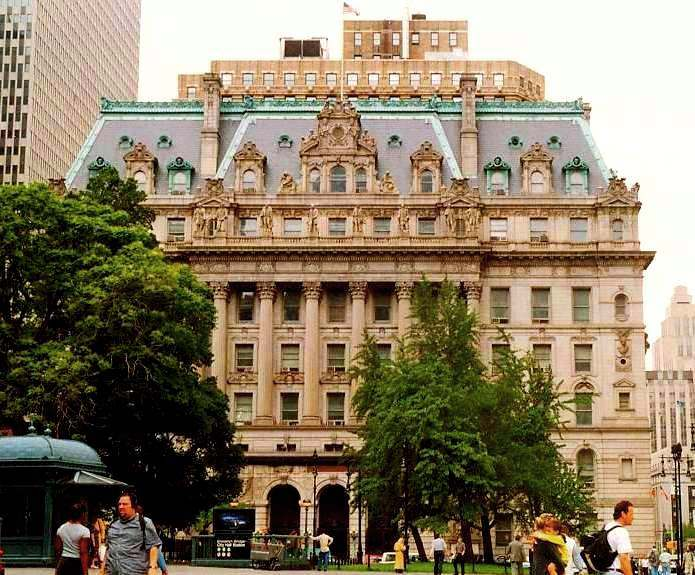
South facade as seen in 2012

The facade of the Surrogate's Courthouse consists mostly of granite from Hallowell, Maine, with ashlar masonry. It is split vertically into a two-story rusticated base, a three-story midsection, a sixth story and a seventh story in a mansard roof. The northern and southern elevations are split vertically into five bays, with multiple windows on each floor in the center bays, while the western and eastern elevations are split into three bays. Thirty-two granite pillars, each weighing between 20 and 40 long tons (22 and 45 short tons; 20 and 41 t), are placed along the facade. The eight pillars on Chambers Street are full columns, while the other pillars are half-columns, whose rear sections have been cut away. The largest columns' pedestals measure 2 feet (0.61 m) thick and weigh an estimated 6 long tons (6.7 short tons; 6.1 t). The capitals measure 6 feet (1.8 m) thick and weigh an estimated 15 long tons (17 short tons; 15 t).

The central portion of the southern (Chambers Street) elevation contains three double-height arched doorways, each of which contains a pair of doors and a window with bronze grilles. The doorways are flanked by granite columns, each cast from a single granite slab and topped by modified composite capitals. This entrance was wainscoted entirely with Siena marble at the building's completion. There are side entrances at the center of the western elevation on Elk Street, from which there is a small flight of steps, as well as at the center of the eastern elevation on Centre Street. The Reade Street elevation contains a wheelchair-accessible entrance. An areaway, measuring 3 to 5 feet (0.91 to 1.52 m) wide, surrounds the building.

On the northern and southern elevations, the central five windows of the third through fifth stories are flanked by a projecting Corinthian style colonnade with four single columns between two paired columns at either end. On all four elevations, the outermost bays are designed with window openings on the second, third, fifth, and sixth stories, and sculptures around porthole windows on the fourth story. The remaining six windows on the north and south, and the center nine windows on the west and east, are slightly recessed behind the end bays, with different window designs on each story. An entablature and a cornice runs above the fifth story, and another cornice runs above the sixth story. The seventh story contains dormer windows with carved hoods, projecting from the mansard roof in all except the end bays.

==== Sculptures ====
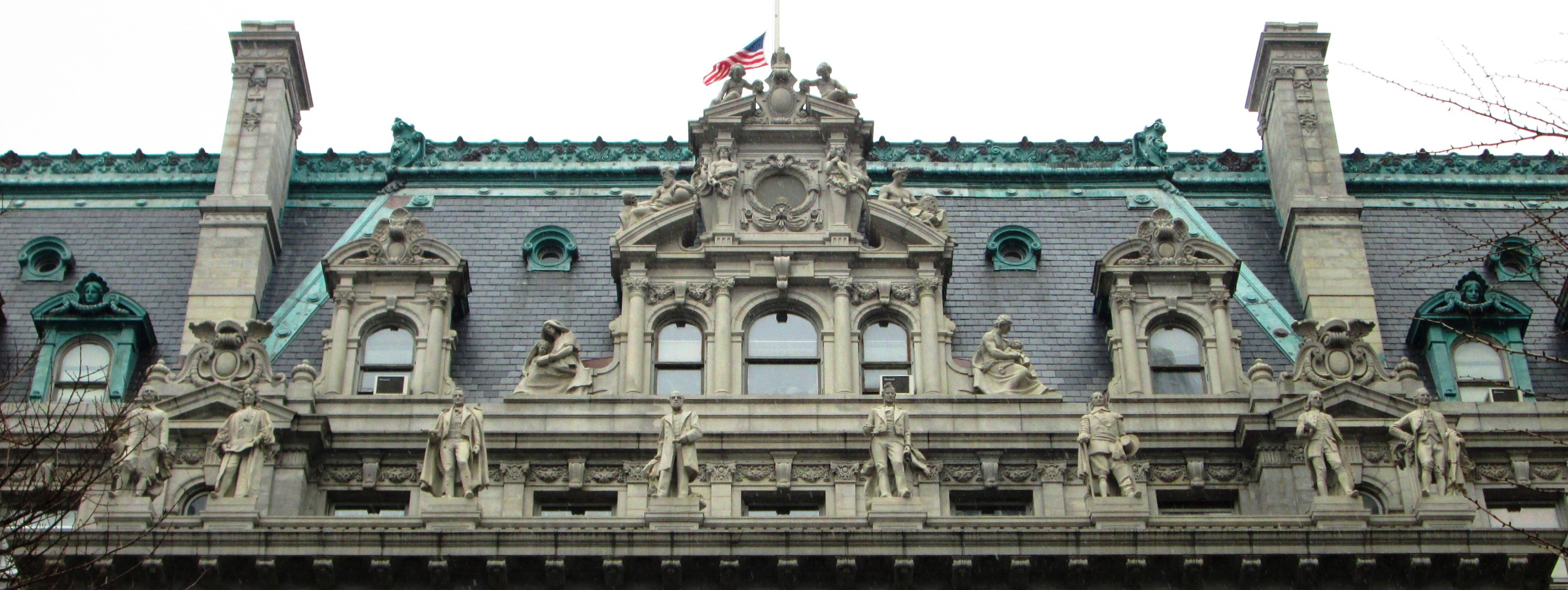
Detail of the mansard roof

The exterior features fifty-four sculptures by Philip Martiny and Henry Kirke Bush-Brown. Martiny was hired for the main sculptural groups, while Bush-Brown designed the smaller sculptures. Like the rest of the facade, the statues were carved from Hallowell granite. The tops of the figures are nearly 150 feet (46 m) above the sidewalk.

On Chambers and Centre Streets, Martiny carved 24 standing figures at the sixth floor, under the cornice. These sculptures depict eminent figures from the city's past, including Peter Stuyvesant, DeWitt Clinton, David Pietersen De Vries, and mayors Caleb Heathcote, Abram Stevens Hewitt, Philip Hone, Cadwallader David Colden and James Duane. Martiny also designed the groups of sculptures flanking the Chambers and Centre Street entrances. Three sculptures flank the Chambers Street entrance, while two originally flanked the Centre Street entrance. The Centre Street sculptures, depicting Justice and Authority, were removed in 1959; they were relocated to the New York County Courthouse.

On all four sides, Bush-Brown designed groups of allegorical figures for the roof. The figures were arranged in standing, sitting, or reclining postures. Figures depicting Heritage and Maternity are at the base of the central dormer on Chambers Street. Above the central Chambers Street dormer is a clock with a dial measuring 4 feet (1.2 m) across, flanked by figures of Poetry and Philosophy and topped by four cherubs and two caryatids. A similar dormer at the center of Reade Street has figures depicting Instruction, Study, Law, and History. The central Centre Street dormer has figures of Inscription and Custody and the central dormer on the west side has Industry and Commerce.

=== Interior ===
==== Entrance vestibules ====
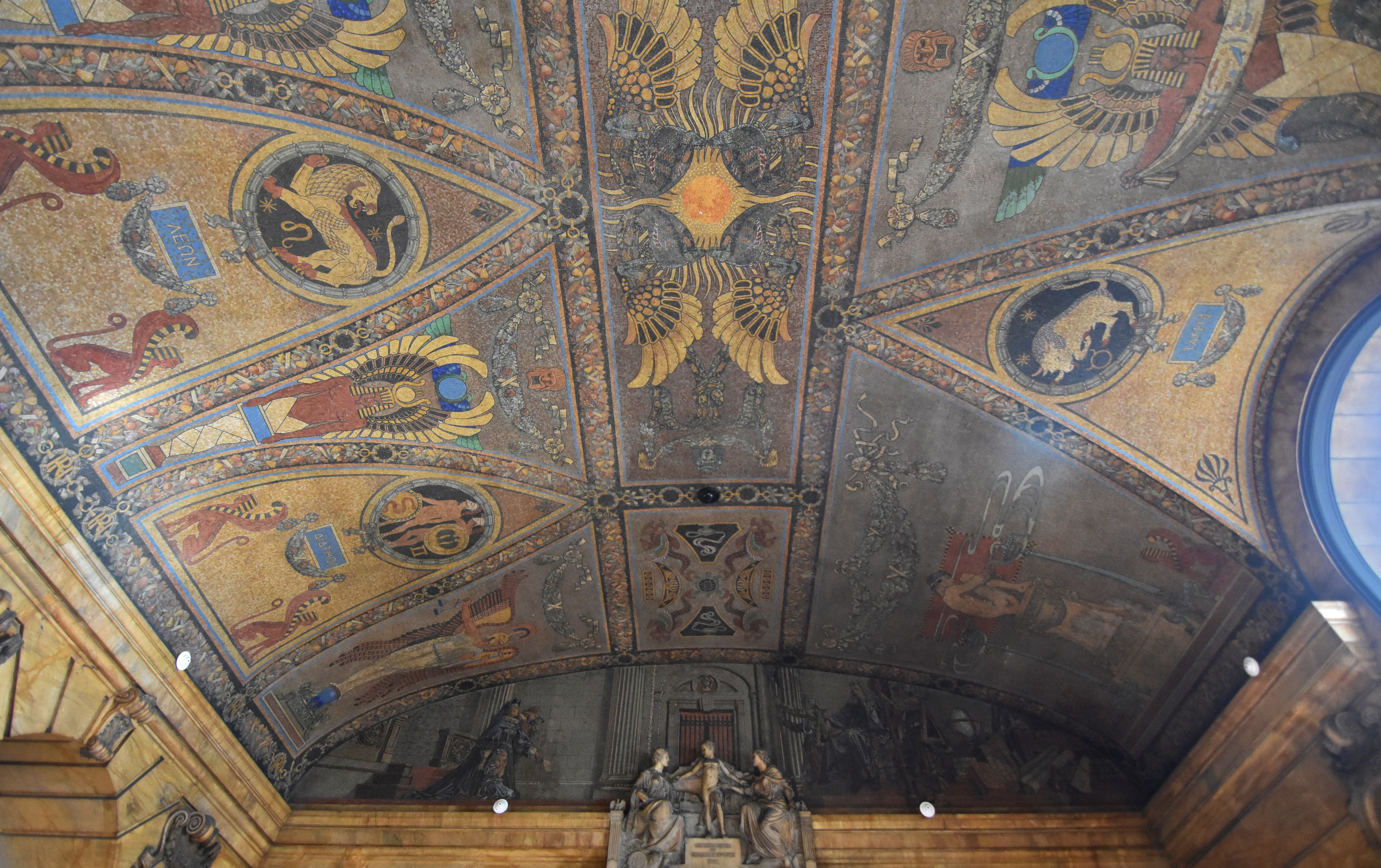
Chambers Street vestibule ceiling, by William de Leftwich Dodge

View from the Chambers Street vestibule toward the main lobby

The rectangular entrance vestibule from Chambers Street contains rusticated yellow marble-clad walls. Just opposite the arched entryways is an arcade with decorative cartouches. Double doors made of mahogany are set within marble doorways at either end of the vestibule. The German sculptor Albert Weinert created two marble sculptural groups, one above each set of doorways; these depict the 1624 purchase of Manhattan Island and the 1898 creation of the City of Greater New York. The vestibule's elliptical ceiling contains mosaic murals and panels created by William de Leftwich Dodge. Of the four mosaic murals, three depict the probate process (in reference to the Surrogates' Court) and the other depicts the continuity of records. The ceiling's triangular mosaic panels depict Egyptian and Greek motifs along with zodiac signs. The mosaic tiles are mostly colored red, green, and blue on dull gold. The vestibule also contains a bronze chandelier, ornamental bronze radiators and a patterned marble floor.

Smaller entrance vestibules also exist on the west and east ends of the Surrogate's Courthouse; they are largely similar, except for the steps outside the west vestibule. Decorative bronze-and-glass enclosures frame the doorways, while there are mosaic lunettes over the two side doors from the vestibules. In the elliptical ceiling vaults of these vestibules, Dodge also designed mosaics set in glass. The mosaics are generally blue and gold but have green and rose accent strips. The ceiling is divided into several panels with decorative elements like garlands, urns, and acanthus scrolls.

==== Lobby and lower stories ====
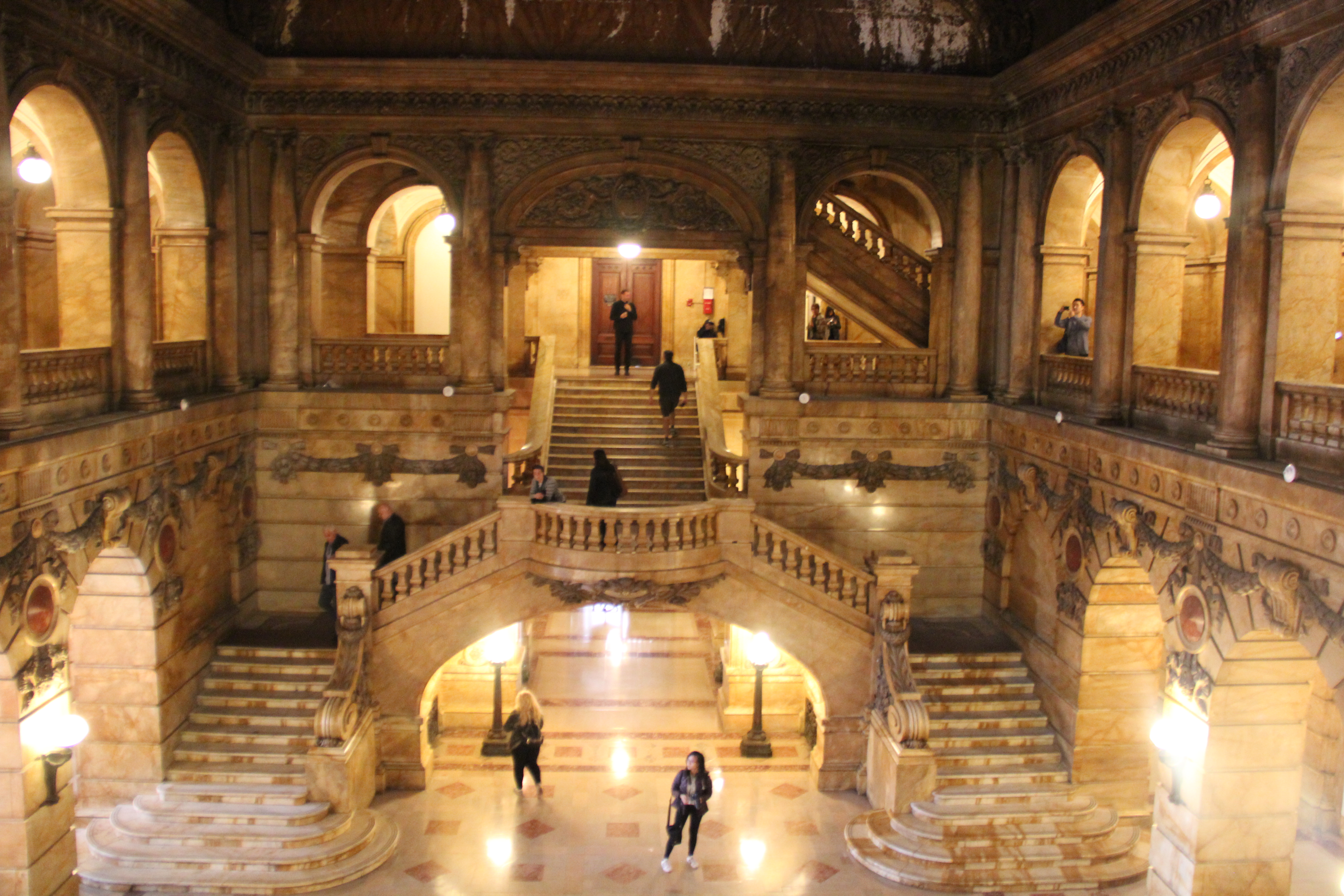
View of the main lobby, with a staircase leading to the second floor

The entrance vestibules lead to the main lobby, a triple-story space whose design was inspired by that of the Palais Garnier, the opera house of the Paris Opera. Yellow Sienna marble was used throughout the lobby. Surrounding the lobby space on the first floor is an arched gallery with rusticated piers, scrolled keystones, red marble roundels, and garlands linking the roundels and keystones. A decorative frieze runs above the first floor gallery. A marble double staircase with balustrade flanks the western entrance archway on the first floor, ascending two flights to an intermediate landing, where a single flight leads to the second floor. On the second floor is a colonnaded gallery containing engaged columns with Ionic-style capitals. The tops of the lobby walls contain decorative entablatures. The ceiling has a bronze elliptical arched vault reaching the height of the third floor. Within the arched vault is a gable-shaped skylight measuring 40 by 60 feet (12 by 18 m).

The hallways on the first floor contain marble walls and multicolored patterned marble floors. The passageways contain groin vaulted ceilings with chandeliers. There are recessed mahogany double-doors leading to the offices, as well as red marble roundels above each doorway. Service functions, such as fuse boxes, are contained within bronze boxes. The second-floor gallery's arches divide the gallery into bays. Within each bay, there are shallow, domed ceilings supported on decorative pendentives, and a cornice runs beneath each dome. On the walls, there are arched openings with mahogany double doors. Above the double staircase in the lobby, a balustraded staircase rises from the second-floor gallery to the third floor, with an intermediate landing above the double stairway.

==== Upper stories ====
The third through fifth floors are largely similar in plan and surround an interior light court above the lobby. These floors are connected by a staircase similar in design to the one connecting the second and third floors. The floor surfaces of the third through fifth stories are made of mosaic tile, and the walls consist of gray-veined marble panels. Each story contains different decorative designs on the frames surrounding the doorways and on the openings facing the light court.

The two Surrogates' courtrooms, on the fifth floor, handle probate and estate proceedings for the New York State Unified Court System. Part of the original design, the rooms contain similar layouts with minor differences in decorative detail. The courtrooms have gilded, paneled plaster ceilings with decorative reliefs and ornate chandeliers. The north courtroom is finished in Santo Domingo mahogany and has four carved panels signifying wisdom, truth, civilization and degradation, as well as six repeating motifs and several portraits of surrogates. The south courtroom is finished in English oak, with French Renaissance style decorative elements. Overlooking each courtroom is a marble balcony, reached by staircases in the respective courtrooms. There are also ornately carved fireplaces, which contain marble mantelpieces lined with bronze surrounds made by Tiffany & Co. The seventh floor and the attic housed the city's records on steel shelves until 2017.

==== Basement ====
The building is surrounded by foundation walls measuring 36 feet (11 m) deep. The vaults of the building's basement extend underneath both Chambers and Reade Streets, descending 40 feet (12 m) under Chambers Street and 30 feet (9.1 m) under Reade Street. The Surrogate's Courthouse had been designed with a small power plant in the basement, which provided power to the building and served neighboring municipally owned buildings.

When the building was completed, its basement had four record rooms. By the 21st century, the basement contained the municipal government's City Hall Library as well as the Municipal Archives. The library consists of two publicly accessible reading rooms, as well as several storerooms beneath the main basement for the Municipal Archives. The collection contains over 400,000 publications, including 66,000 books and 285,000 newspapers, journals, magazines, and periodical clippings. The material in the collection totals over 200,000 cubic feet (5,700 m^{3}). The basement also included more than 720,000 photographs on rolls of nitrate film, which were stored in freezers, in addition to some New York Supreme Court records.

== History ==
=== Background ===
In 1831, the original Hall of Records opened northeast of City Hall on the site of the "New Gaol", the old city jail, in present-day City Hall Park. The New Gaol building dated from the late 1750s. The New-York Mirror described the original building as a Grecian-style structure with marble-columned porticoes on each side, as well as stucco walls, a copper roof, and masonry floors. In 1870, the original building was expanded by one story and a "fireproof" roof was erected. The first Hall of Records became dilapidated over time and, as early as 1872, lawyers had objected to the rundown condition of the building. Despite its fireproof appearance, the first Hall of Records used wood extensively in its floors and roof. By the late 19th century, the structure housed records pertaining to properties worth a total of $4 billion. (Note: Equivalent to $130.6 billion in 2025) An 1889 New York Times article described the old building as having nearly 7,000 volumes, which were "constantly threatened by destruction". The first Hall of Records was razed in 1903, and an entrance to the New York City Subway's Brooklyn Bridge station was built there.

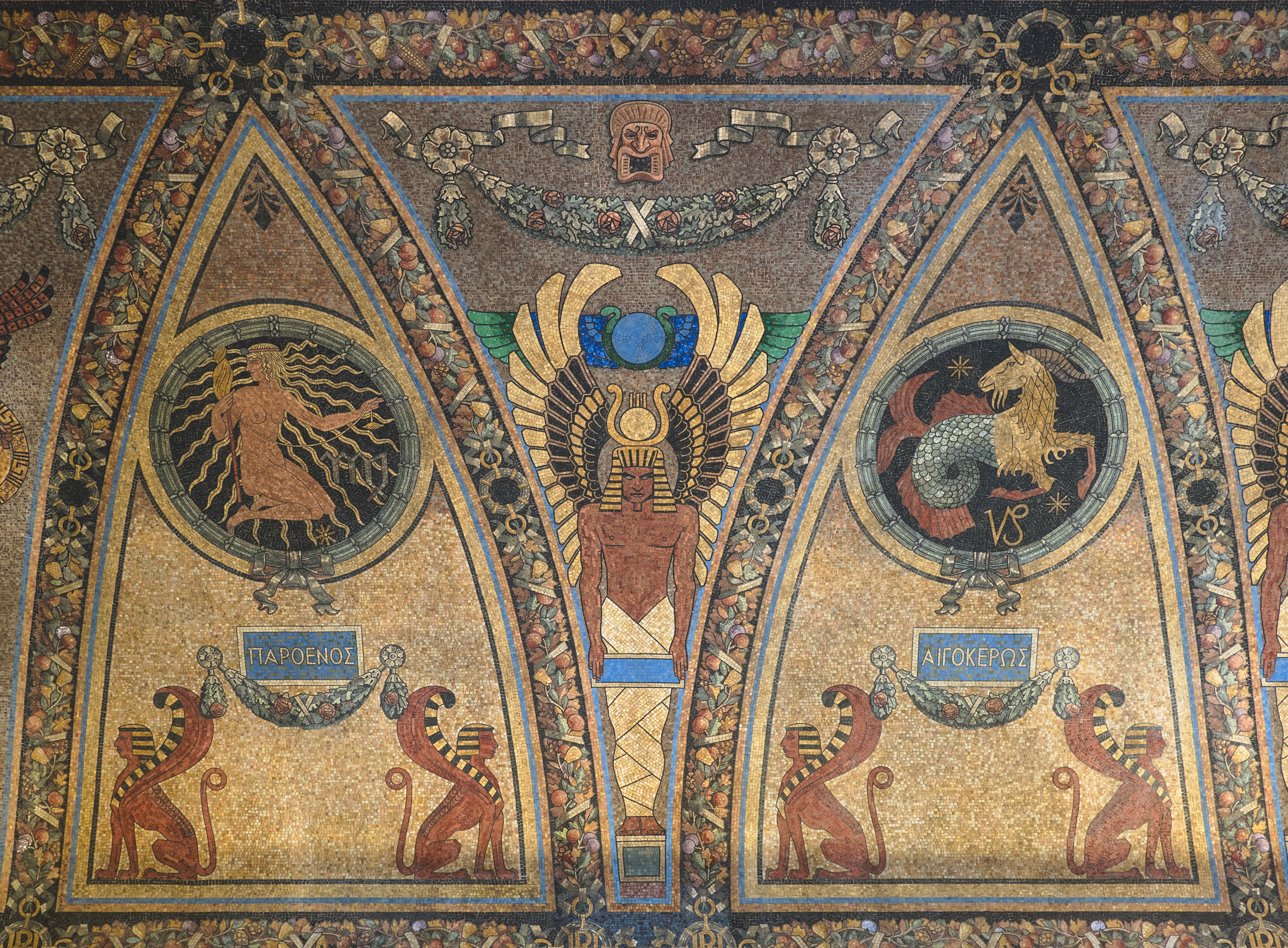
Segment of the ceiling mosaic by William de Leftwich Dodge

The New York City Bar Association had advocated the construction of a new Hall of Records as early as 1889. A grand jury reported in March 1896 that the old Hall of Records was "unsafe and susceptible to destruction by fire". The New York City Department of Health reportedly "repeatedly condemned" conditions in the old building. In a November 1896 meeting of the New York City Board of Estimate, Ashbel P. Fitch, the New York City Comptroller, offered a resolution to create a committee to select a site for a new Hall of Records building. A coalition of lawyers, businesspeople, real estate developers, and property owners formed the next month to advocate for a new building. At the time, the city government preferred that new municipal buildings be erected in the area immediately outside City Hall Park, instead of inside the park, as the old Hall of Records had been.

=== Development ===
The state legislature authorized a new Hall of Records building in early 1897, and the Board of Estimate recommended a 40,000-square-foot (3,700 m^{2}) site on the west side of Centre Street, between Reade and Chambers Streets. The site was approved in April 1897 despite the objection of Fitch, who believed that a site immediately to the north would be cheaper. The site approval included an extension of Elm (now Elk) Street southward from Reade to Chambers Street. The Elm Street extension, forming the site's western boundary, was completed in 1901. The site was valued at $1.3 million at the time of its approval. (Note: Equivalent to $43 million in 2025)

==== Design and land acquisition ====
Initially, the city government had contemplated hosting a new architectural design competition for the new Hall of Records, but advocates of the new building's construction worried that the competition would introduce unnecessary delays. Instead, they suggested that the city hire John R. Thomas, who had won the second of four architectural design competitions for the Manhattan Municipal Building (held between 1892 and 1894). From the 134 plans submitted, six finalist designs were chosen in 1894. In February 1896, the Municipal Building Commission of New York City awarded Thomas the first prize in the design competition, which included his employment as the architect of the municipal building. The municipal building for which Thomas had prepared plans had been canceled in 1894. Despite the municipal building's cancellation, the city paid Thomas $7,000 for his plans. (Note: Equivalent to $229,000 in 2025)

Thomas was selected as the Hall of Records' architect upon the urging of then-mayor William Lafayette Strong. Strong, who had been elected on a platform of political reform in 1895, said the city government could save money by adopting Thomas's existing plans. According to architecture critic Montgomery Schuyler, Strong had reminded the Board of Estimate that Thomas "deserved some consolation for a failure that had occurred by no fault of his own". Additionally, Thomas had previously revised a plan for the Elmira State Reformatory to save the New York state government $1 million on that project, (Note: Equivalent to $32.7 million in 2025) and Strong appreciated Thomas's intentions to reduce costs. Thomas presented his plans to the Board of Estimate in May 1897, and the board referred the plans to a committee composed of Schuyler, architect William Robert Ware and philanthropist Henry Gurdon Marquand. The Board of Estimate approved them and authorized bids for the building's construction in November 1897. The American Institute of Architects opposed Thomas's hiring, insisting that a design competition should have been hosted instead, but Thomas remained as the building's architect.

Difficulties in acquiring the plots for the building's site delayed the start of work. Some of the old buildings on the site were sold in early 1898. Other property owners resisted the seizure of their property through eminent domain. The resistance of one landowner (the Wendel family, which owned a myriad of Manhattan properties and had a policy to "never sell anything") required the state legislature to pass a special act to obtain the small portion of the site owned by the Wendels. Lessees also objected to the fact that they would not be compensated for the unexpired terms of their leases.

==== Start of construction ====
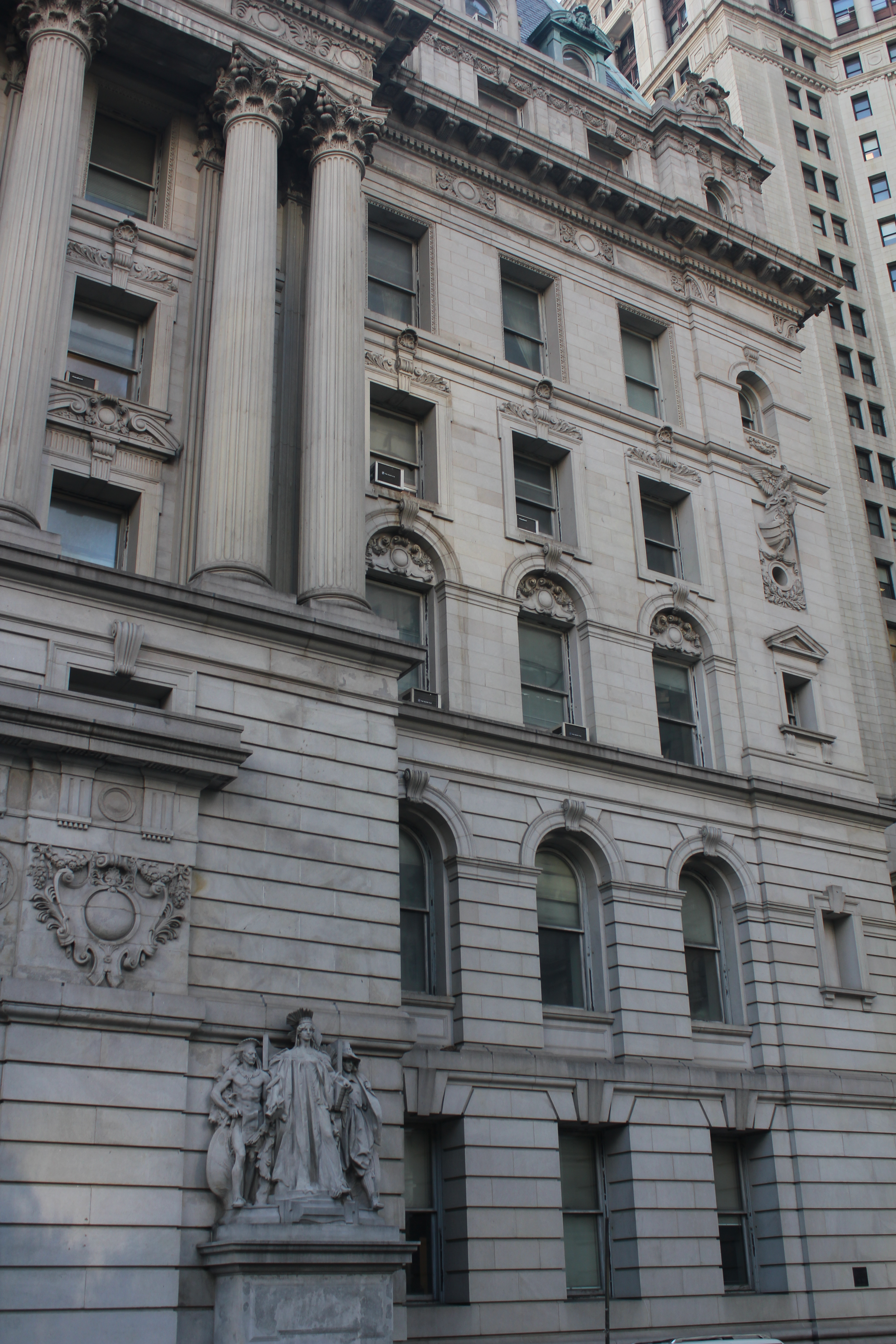
Windows on the eastern part of the Chambers Street elevation

Thirteen companies submitted bids for granite in December 1897. John Peirce won the contract to supply white Hallowell granite; his bid had been the highest, at $1.997 million, (Note: Equivalent to $66.4 million in 2025) but the city hired him anyway because of his reputation as a granite supplier. Henry Clay Mandeville was the construction superintendent.

Work on the foundations began in early 1899, but was halted after about ninety days. The main reason was a lack of funding; several bond authorizations for the building had been delayed. Peirce filed a lawsuit in July 1899 to receive payment for the granite he had supplied, and the State Supreme Court issued a mandamus to authorize a bond issue to pay Pierce. The City Council passed a bill to that effect on August 3. The City Council adopted a resolution in a contentious vote the following week authorizing the issuance of $2.1 million in bonds (Note: Equivalent to $68.6 million in 2025) for the building's construction; the City Council president Randolph Guggenheimer was called to cast the deciding vote. Guggenheimer said the bonds could be placed for sale. Construction resumed in September 1899; the construction contract stipulated that the building's walls and roof be finished within 550 workdays. The city issued $450,000 in bonds in January 1900 (Note: Equivalent to $14.3 million in 2025) and issued the remaining $1.6 million in bonds that December. (Note: Equivalent to $50.8 million in 2025)

Meanwhile, the Tammany Hall-affiliated Robert Anderson Van Wyck had won the 1897 mayoral election, taking office the next year. Soon after his inauguration, Van Wyck accused the Strong administration of "extravagance" in its design. Van Wyck wanted to appoint Horgan and Slattery, who were friendly with the Tammany political machine, as the project's architects. Initially, he wanted to add five stories to the building, which were to be used as municipal offices. He canceled these plans after he was informed not only that the existing eight-story Hall of Records would be equivalent to an eleven-story building, but also that a thirteen-story building would be extremely difficult to defend in a fire. There were several other unsuccessful schemes for the site, including proposals for the municipal building and a new county courthouse. Thomas called the alternate plans impractical, saying that the foundations could not support additional stories.

Van Wyck also appointed Horgan and Slattery in 1899 to conduct a report on possible ways to reduce the cost of the interior furnishings. The original interior cost was to be $2.5 million. (Note: Equivalent to $81.6 million in 2025) Following Horgan and Slattery's recommendations, the interior appropriation was reduced by $1 million. (Note: Equivalent to $32.7 million in 2025) In determining the revised appropriation, Horgan and Slattery had suggested that the interior surfaces be made of cement rather than marble. Thomas unsuccessfully sought to have the appropriation restored, saying that the building's design would be "spoiled" if he did not have at least $2.25 million. (Note: Equivalent to $73.5 million in 2025) When Van Wyck threatened to fire Thomas, the architect agreed to reduce the cost of the interior to $1.9 million. (Note: Equivalent to $62.0 million in 2025) The Board of Estimate requested bids for interior decoration in June 1900. The board rejected all the bids, saying the comptroller's office had received anonymous complaints that Thomas had shown favoritism to certain contractors. Once the bids were rejected, the complaints were withdrawn without further explanation. Peirce ultimately received the interior contract in 1901.

==== Change of architect and completion ====
Guggenheimer laid the building's cornerstone at a ceremony on April 13, 1901. Work had progressed slightly when Thomas died in August 1901. Under pressure from Van Wyck, the Board of Estimate appointed Horgan and Slattery as the new architects two weeks later, prompting the Thomas estate to sue for damages. The New York Times criticized the change in plans as a "Horganizing and Slatterifying" of Thomas's original design. Comptroller Bird S. Coler protested against Horgan and Slattery's appointment, and Fitch refused to give Thomas's plans to Horgan and Slattery. The firm could not collect fees unless they had the plans. After Seth Low won the 1901 New York City mayoral election, he reversed some of the changes made to Thomas's plan. Low also unsuccessfully tried to have Horgan and Slattery removed as the architects. Pierce began installing some of the facade's smaller pillars in March 1902, and the first of the eight large columns on Chambers Street was installed the next month. The columns were so heavy that two derricks had to be used to lift each column. By that October, the city had decided to demolish the old Hall of Records. At the end of the year, records were moved to a temporary site in the Morton Building on Nassau Street.

Early in 1903, the Board of Estimate moved to approve Thomas's original plans for the interior of the new building. Horgan and Slattery unilaterally hired Philip Martiny to design the building's sculptures that year, and Henry Kirke Bush-Brown was hired to design additional sculptures. Critics said the two sculptors could not commission the sculptures to the desired specifications in a short enough time period, while the city's Municipal Art Commission objected that Horgan and Slattery did not present them with general plans for the sculptures and decorative marble. The few samples that Horgan and Slattery did submit to the Municipal Art Commission were minor architectural details such as pedestals. The city's Fine Arts Association submitted proposals in March 1903 to decorate the interiors with murals. Low upheld Martiny's and Bush-Brown's contracts in June, which The New York Times estimated to be worth $75,000, (Note: Equivalent to $2.2 million in 2025) (Note: According to a Architects' and Builders' Magazine article that month, $120,000 was allocated to the sculptural group (about $3.4 million in 2025), or two percent of the proposed $6 million cost (about $172.4 million in 2025).) but deferred the completion of the interior murals. The statues were delivered during the middle of that year, though one of the statues fell off and cracked in 1905.

As late as 1904, there were plans to convert the nearly complete building into one wing of a new county courthouse. Three city departments were scheduled to move into the new Hall of Records building in May 1904, when their existing leases expired, but the building was not complete at the time. Further delays were announced in May 1905, including the plan for Horgan and Slattery to remodel the not-yet-complete interior for $500,000. (Note: Equivalent to $13.9 million in 2025) The Board of Estimate received four bids for the interior outfitting in June 1905, of which the lowest bid was $1.33 million, (Note: Equivalent to $36.9 million in 2025) but the city's borough presidents initially refused to provide additional money for the interiors. City controller Edward M. Grout requested that the Board of Estimate grant the appropriation; at the time, the total construction cost was estimated at $7.84 million. (Note: Equivalent to $217.5 million in 2025) A New-York Tribune report that November claimed that, had the building been erected by private interests, it would have opened in 1903 and cost $2 million less. (Note: Equivalent to $55.5 million in 2025) The Board of Estimate launched an inquiry into the delays in 1906, and the building's elevators were tested that March. The Municipal Art Commission, which was still reluctant to approve the sculptures, finally consented in September 1906.

=== Use ===
==== 1900s to 1940s ====
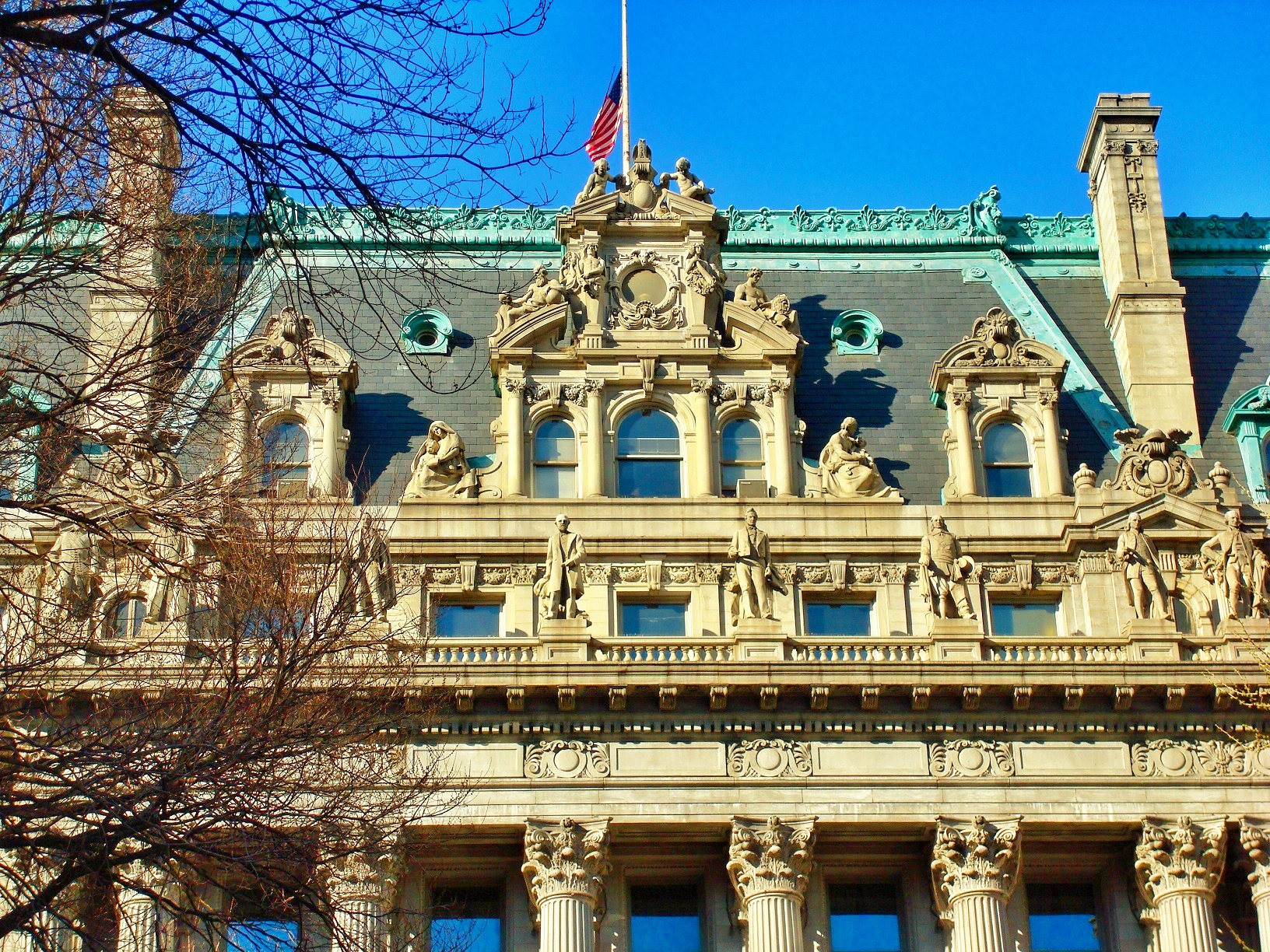
Chambers Street facade detail

The New York City Controller's office began moving its records to the building in mid-1906. The first municipal workers began moving their records and books into the Hall of Records that October, when the Department of Taxes and Assessments began meeting within the building. Many of the railings and shelves had not been finished at the time. The City Register moved into the building in December 1906, even as work on the ceilings was still incomplete. Horgan and Slattery claimed its final cost was $5.063 million, (Note: Equivalent to $127.8 million in 2025) (Note: Of this, $4 million in contracts ($100.8 million in 2025) was awarded during Strong's mayoral administration, while the other $1 million ($25.2 million in 2025) was used for fireproofing, wooden decorative elements, furnishings, and Hall of Records equipment.) while other estimates placed the cost as high as $10 million. (Note: Equivalent to $251.9 million in 2025) Ten percent of the construction cost went to Horgan and Slattery's design fee. From the beginning, the Hall of Records contained space for New York City's departments of finance, taxes and assessments, and law, as well as the New York County Register, County Clerk, and Surrogate's Court. A small number of records from the previous Hall of Records were never transferred to the new building and were lost.

Shortly after the building's opening, news outlets reported that some of the building's "marble" was made of plaster, but this was consistent with the construction contract calling for "plaster enrichment". The substitution was not the result of corruption, but of the many changes in plans under the administrations of three mayors. During mid-1907, the president of the Department of Taxes and Assessments suggested removing the false-marble panels above each doorway, which by then had already started to darken. In addition, despite the building's high construction cost and the $90,000 annual maintenance cost, (Note: Equivalent to $2.3 million in 2025) the New-York Tribune reported in 1907 that the building was already dirty and that some furnishings had been damaged to an extent described as "little short of criminal".

In 1911, the Hall of Records' power plant began providing electricity to two other buildings nearby. George McAneny, the borough president of New York City, also proposed installing an ice-making plant in the building's basement in 1913, which would have been supplied by the building's power plant. By the mid-1910s, the building contained 8,000 books of property titles, one million mortgages, and over one million deeds. Other agencies and organizations moved to the building after its completion. The Vehicular Tunnel Commission was established in the Hall of Records in 1919 to oversee the Holland Tunnel's construction, and an employment bureau for soldiers opened there the same year. The Naval Reserve Force also opened an office on the third floor in the 1910s. After the city's oldest records (dating from the 16th and 17th centuries) were rediscovered in the late 1920s, they were moved to the Hall of Records.

The original elevators in the Hall of Records operated for several decades and, over the years, the number of elevators was cut from ten to six. Faults in the Hall of Records' elevator system had resulted in several deaths, while elevator operators were reluctant to operate them. The city government spent several hundred thousand dollars to repair the faulty elevators during the 1930s and 1940s.

==== 1950s to 1990s ====
In 1950, the city sold off around 500,000 old chattel mortgages and other records to provide space for newer documents in the Hall of Records. New elevators were installed in the building in 1953. During the decade, officials microfilmed about 845,000 of the building's records to preserve them in case of a nuclear bombing. The city proposed converting all of the records to microfilm, but real-estate professionals opposed the plan because they would no longer be able to access physical record books. Another modification was made to the eastern facade in 1959, when the statues flanking the Centre Street entrance were removed because of street-widening work and the expansion of the underlying subway station. The statues were reinstalled at the New York County Courthouse in the early 1960s.

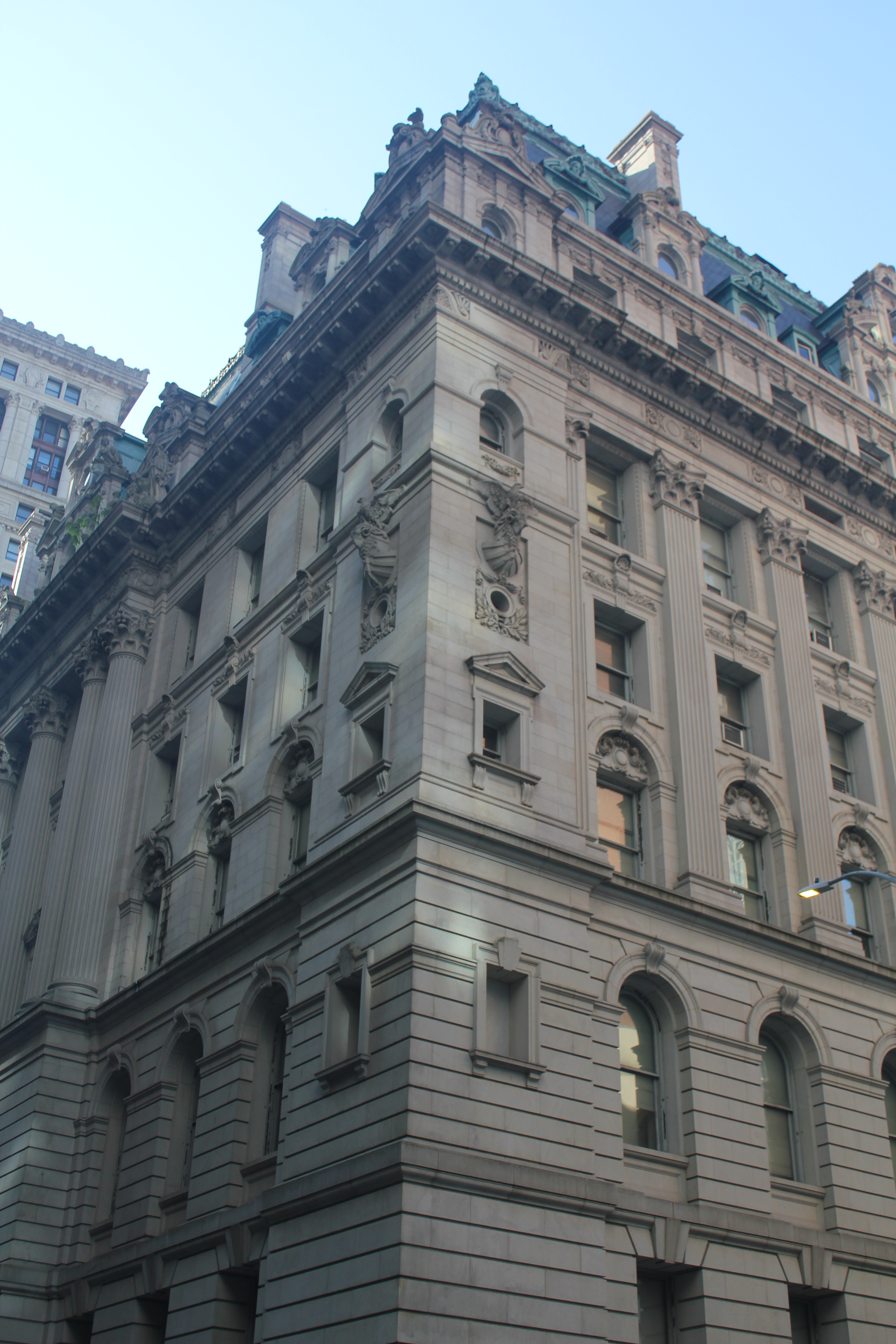
Detail of the facade at the corner of Reade and Elk Streets

The Hall of Records was renamed the Surrogate's Courthouse in 1962. The New York City Council adopted a resolution to rename the structure that October because most of the building's space was used by the court and related offices. By that decade, the records of the Surrogates' Court were spread across four stories of the building. During the mid-1960s, the government of New York City proposed a new Civic Center municipal building, which would have entailed destroying several surrounding buildings. The architects of the planned building had proposed the courthouse's eventual demolition because the plans called for the new building and City Hall to be the only structures in an expanded City Hall Park. Land acquisition began in late 1964, but the redevelopment plans were ultimately scrapped during the 1975 New York City fiscal crisis.

During a renovation of the Municipal Building in the 1970s, the Municipal Reference Center was moved to the Surrogate's Courthouse. The facade of the Surrogate's Courthouse was also cleaned in the 1970s. Following a $300,000 renovation of the building's first floor, (Note: Equivalent to $1.2 million in 2025) the Department of Records and Information Services (DORIS) was founded in 1977 on the first floor. The new agency superseded the Municipal Reference Center and the separate Municipal Archives and Record Center, which housed the archives.

During the late 20th century, archival materials from other locations in New York City were also relocated to the Surrogate's Courthouse. In addition, exhibits of archival material were sometimes displayed in the building's main lobby. New York City mayor Rudy Giuliani proposed transferring DORIS's 100,000-cubic-foot (2,800 m^{3}) archive within the building to the New York City Department of Citywide Administrative Services (DCAS) in the late 1990s, but the city's archivists opposed the move. By then, most of the Municipal Archives' collection was stored at Bush Terminal in Brooklyn, rather than at the Surrogate's Courthouse. Unlike the courthouse, the Bush Terminal facility did not have climate control, prompting concerns over the deterioration of the records at Bush Terminal.

==== 2000s to present ====
The New York City Department of Finance used part of the second floor for registering and storing mortgages and deeds until 2001. New York Times reporter David W. Dunlap wrote in 2006 that, although the general public could not enter the building unless they had business there, DCAS had advised its guards to allow visitors to see the lobby. The general public was allowed to access the records in the building, but the archival rooms could not fit large groups. The New York City Department of Cultural Affairs moved into a 13,000-square-foot (1,200 m^{2}) space on the second floor in 2006, following a $4.1 million renovation designed by Swanke Hayden Connell Architects. (Note: Equivalent to $6.3 million in 2025) The Building Energy Exchange was also established in the Surrogate's Courthouse in 2015, occupying a 5,500-square-foot (510 m^{2}) space once used as a courtroom and as a film set.

By the early 21st century, the Surrogate's Courthouse no longer provided sufficient space for the city's records. In 2017, DORIS began moving the records to the New York State Archives, as well as to the Municipal Archives in the building's basement. In addition, between 2016 and 2020, Urbahn Architects renovated the lobby's skylight, which involved replacing several parts of the corroded steel frame as well as adding replicas of the original skylight's glass blocks. The skylight replacement project received the 2020 Lucy Moses Preservation Award from the New York Landmarks Conservancy. As part of the "Halls of the City" program, in early 2026, the New York City government began renting out the Surrogate's Courthouse and several other properties for events. The courthouse accommodated events with up to 275 people seated or 500 standing. Events hosted there included a New York Fashion Week exhibition, along with gatherings organized by Solange Knowles and Goldman Sachs.

== Impact ==
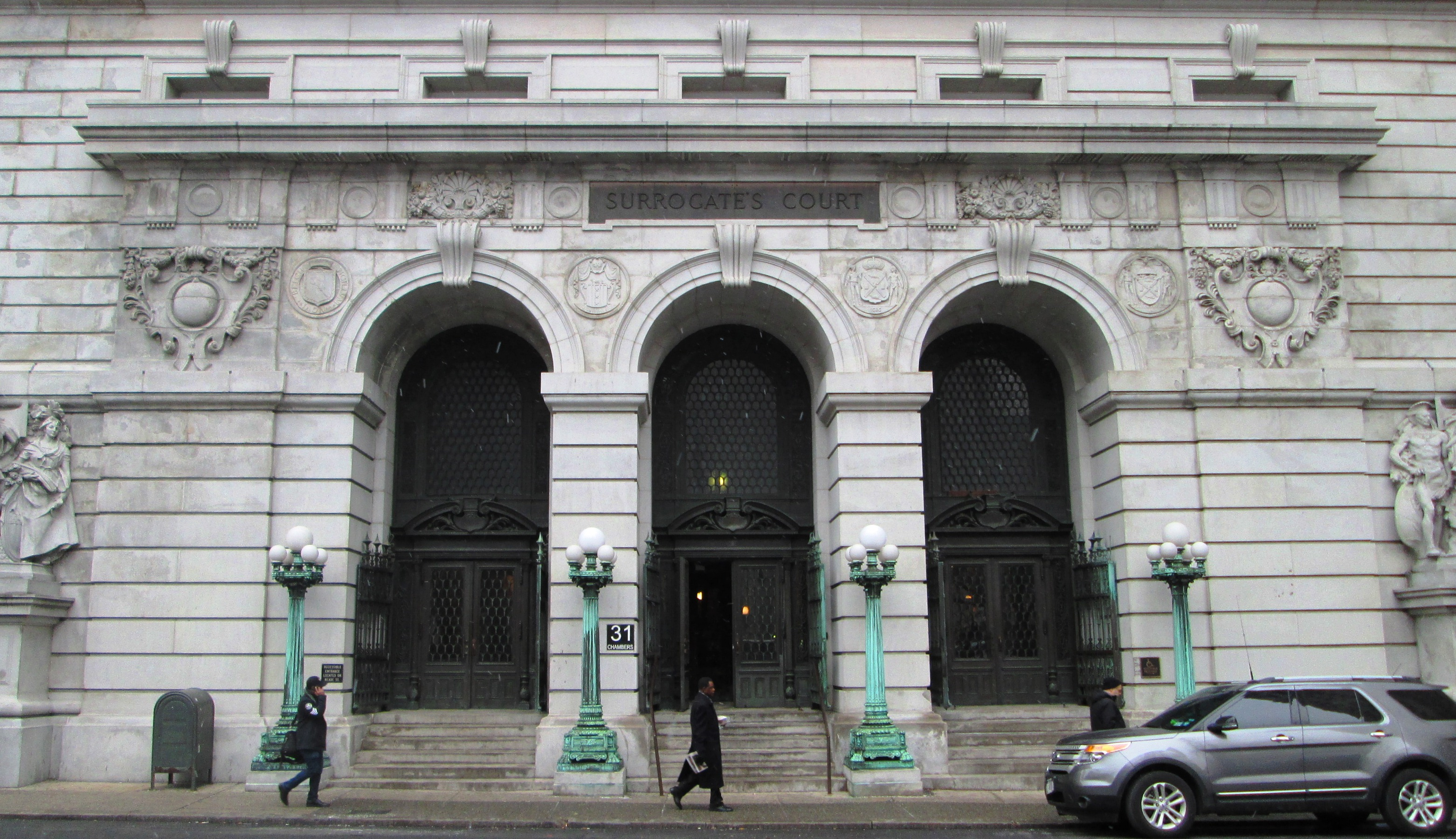
Chambers Street entrance

Upon the Hall of Records' completion, the Brooklyn Daily Eagle said: "The exterior of the big granite pile on Chambers and Centre streets may appeal to the artistic eye, but the interior is a positive revelation, and there is probably nothing like it in any city of the Union." Montgomery Schuyler, who had been on the committee that approved Thomas's plans, wrote in 1905 that "the Hall of Records comes nearer than any other public building in New York to recalling" what he described as a "Parisian" quality. Schuyler said that the design "has reproduced the effect of monuments designed under so much simpler conditions". The Detroit Free Press praised the Hall of Records as "one of the most beautiful pieces of architecture in the country", and The Christian Science Monitor similarly described the structure as one of the city's prettiest buildings. Broadway Magazine said that the building "to some appears wasteful extravagance, to others wonderful and satisfying art".

Architecture critic Paul Goldberger stated that the courthouse's interior was one of the city's finest Beaux-Arts interiors, and he compared the building favorably to two contemporaries in lower Manhattan, the smaller Chamber of Commerce Building and the larger Custom House. Goldberger also wrote in 1977 that the structure competed with the Custom House, the New York Public Library Main Branch, and Grand Central Terminal "for the title of New York's finest Beaux-Arts building". The New York City Landmarks Preservation Commission (LPC) described the Hall of Records building as "representative of a period when the Municipality of New York felt itself coming of age". The building has been used as a filming location for the television shows Law & Order, Gotham, and Elementary.

The LPC designated the exterior of the Surrogate's Courthouse as a New York City landmark in 1966, and the interior was similarly designated in 1976. The building was placed on the National Register of Historic Places in 1972, and it was also designated a National Historic Landmark in 1977 for its architecture. The Surrogate's Courthouse building is also located within two historic districts. It is part of the African Burial Ground and the Commons Historic District, which was designated a city landmark district in 1993. The building is also within the boundaries of the African Burial Ground Historic District, a National Historic Landmark District, though it is not a contributing property to the district.

== See also ==
- List of New York City Designated Landmarks in Manhattan below 14th Street
- National Historic Landmarks in New York City
- National Register of Historic Places listings in Manhattan below 14th Street
