= Squadron A Armory =

Building in Manhattan, New York

- Madison Avenue Facade of the Squadron A Armory
- U.S. National Register of Historic Places
- New York State Register of Historic Places
- New York City Landmark
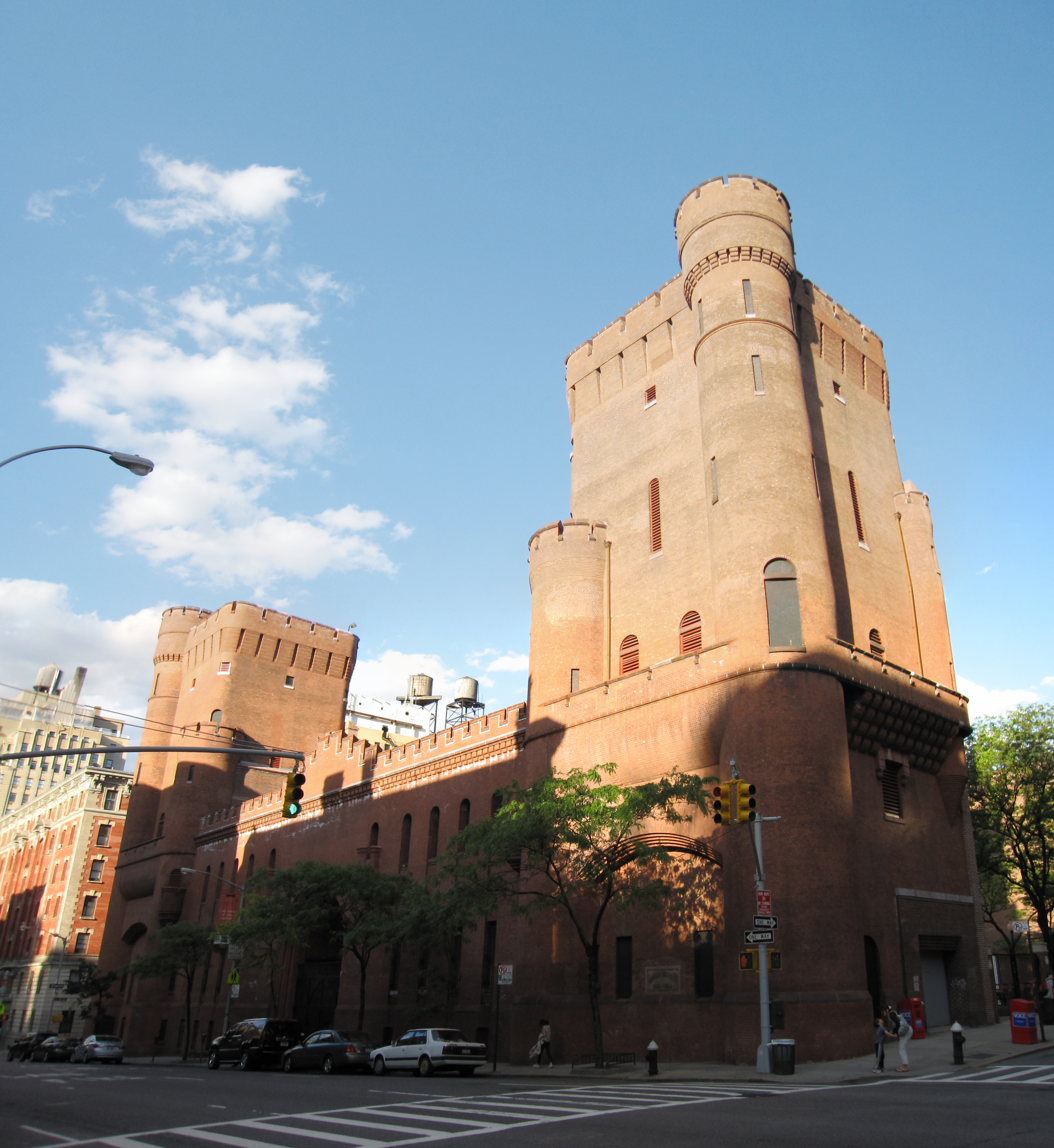
- Location: Madison Avenue between 94th and 95th Streets, New York City
- Coordinates: 40°47′10″N 73°57′15″W
- Built: 1895
- Architect: John R. Thomas
- NRHP reference No.: 72000877
- NYSRHP No.: 06101.000402
- NYCL No.: 0181

Significant dates
- Added to NRHP: March 24, 1972
- Designated NYSRHP: June 23, 1980
- Designated NYCL: October 19, 1966

The Squadron A Armory is a former United States Army armory and was the home base of Squadron A. It took up the whole block between Madison Avenue and Park Avenue, between 94th and 95th Streets, in Manhattan, New York City, New York. It was therefore also known as the Madison Avenue Armory. A surviving part of the building is listed on the National Register of Historic Places as the Madison Avenue Facade of the Squadron A Armory and is a New York City landmark.

A stone plaque with the squadron's cry "Boutez en avant!", translated variously as "Press forward!" or simply "Charge!", is located on the wall at Madison Avenue.

== History ==
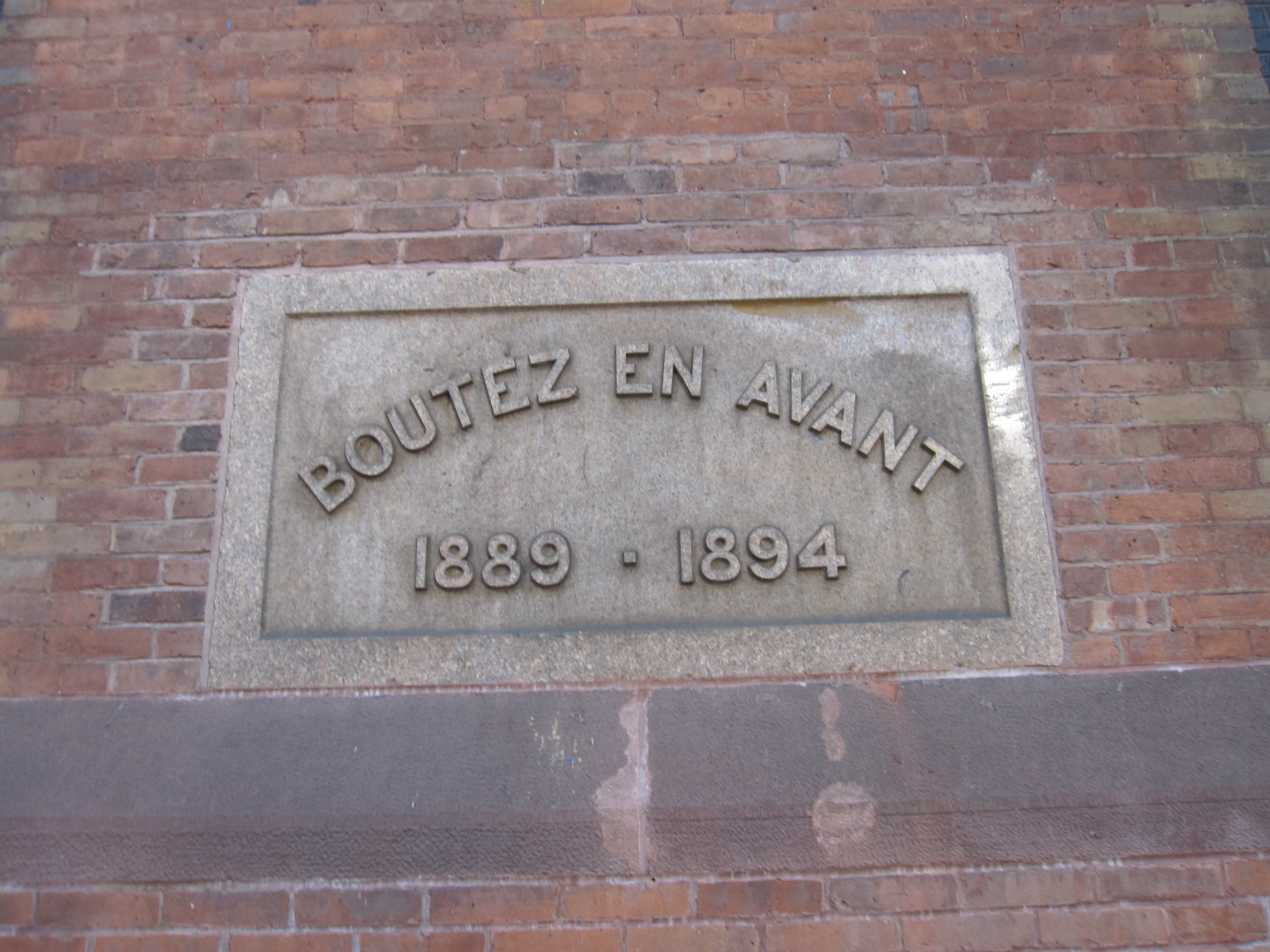
"Boutez en avant!" stone plaque

The building was built in 1895 by a New York City contractor named John F. Johnson. It was constructed with red bricks, featuring massive walls with towers. It also included about 100 horse stalls to house Squadron A's horses.

The building was partially demolished in the 1960s; however, an emergency action from the New York City Landmarks Preservation Commission, which designated it a landmark, stopped the demolition of the Madison Avenue facade. That facade was later added to the National Register of Historic Places in 1972. When the eastern building was rebuilt, it was done in a style similar to the original.

List of units stationed at the Squadron A Armory
Unit(s) stationed	Years
Troop A	1889–1894
Squadron A (Troops 1 and 2)	1895
Squadron A (Troops 1, 2, and 3)	1896-1897
Troop A, New York Volunteer Cavalry	Spanish American War
Squadron A (Troops 1, 2, and 3)	1899–1906
Squadron A (Troops 1, 2, 3, and 4)	1907–1910
1st Cavalry (1st Squadron)	1911
1st Cavalry (Troops A, E, F, and G)	1912
1st Squadron (Troops A, B, C, and D)	1913
Squadron A	1914–??

=== Usage ===
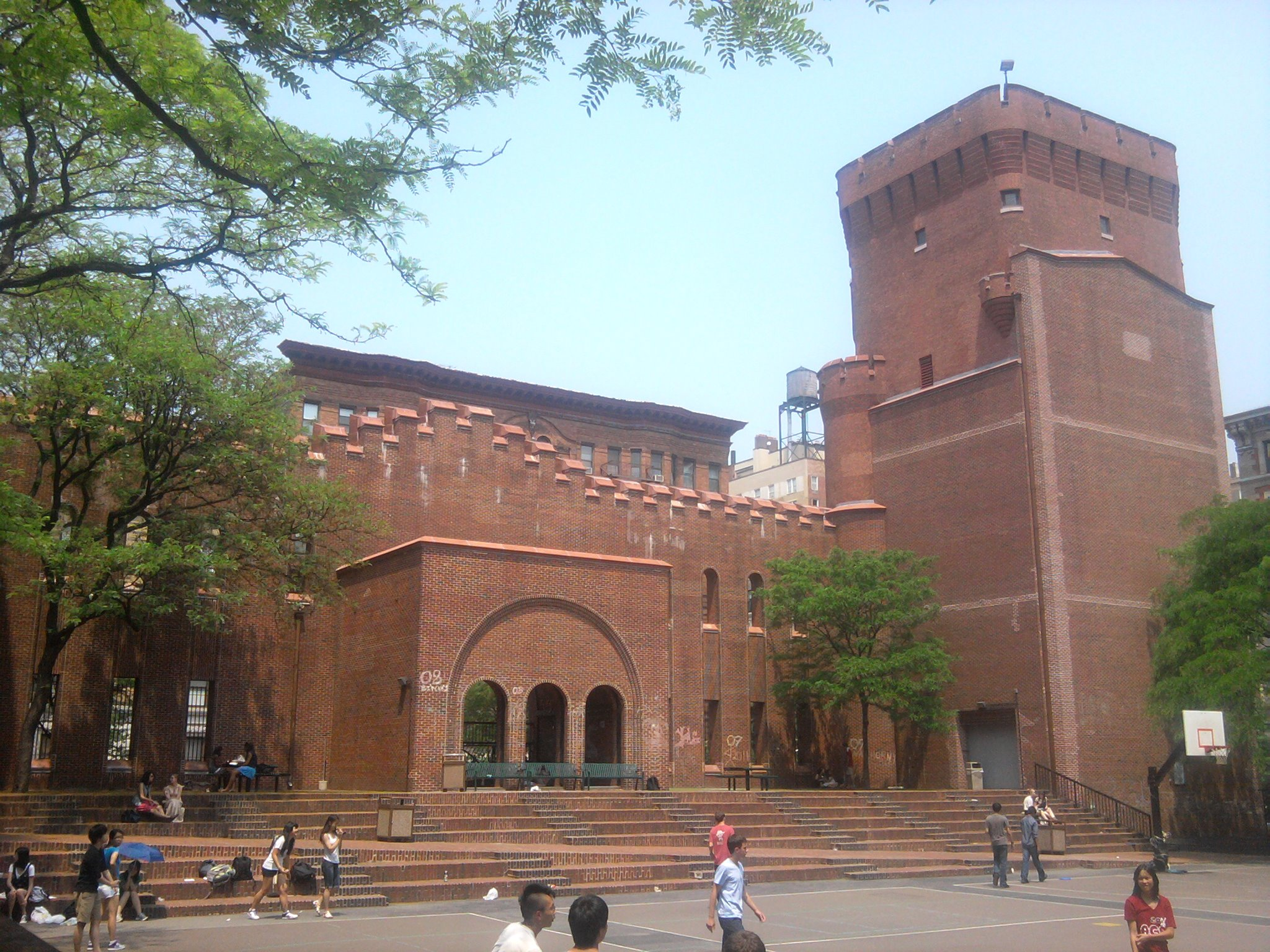
Eastern (interior) side of facade

Today, the eastern and central parts of the site are used by Hunter College High School and Elementary School as the schools' main campus. The outline of some of the former walls is lined with trees.

== See also ==
- List of armories and arsenals in New York City and surrounding counties
- Seventh Regiment Armory
- List of New York City Designated Landmarks in Manhattan from 59th to 110th Streets
- National Register of Historic Places listings in Manhattan from 59th to 110th Streets
