= Christopher Ross (sculptor) =

American sculptor and designer (1931 - 2023)

- Born: May 9, 1931; New York City, New York, U.S.
- Died: September 17, 2023 (aged 92)
- Education: Millbrook School, Collegiate School
- Alma mater: Columbia University
- Occupations: Sculptor, designer and collector
- Known for: Animal Sculpture
- Awards: Grand Cross of the Order of Merit of the Royal House of Braganza; Knight of the Order of Saints Maurice and Lazarus of the Royal House of Savoy
- Website: Christopher Ross

Christopher Ross FRSA OSSML (May 9, 1931 – September 17, 2023) was an American artist, designer and collector of 19th century Imperial militaria. Ross has earned an international reputation for his 'animal' wearable fine art and portrait sculpture in the tradition of the French animalier. His work resists easy classification as he carved out a territory of his own that crosses categories—drawing on fine art, sculpture and design.

In 2023, Ross was bestowed a knighthood of the dynastic order of Saints Maurice and Lazarus by the Royal House of Savoy and a Grand Cross of the Royal House of Braganza for his contributions to European art and culture and his lifelong commitment and pursuit of beauty, quality and excellence.

== Life ==
Christopher Ross, the son of Captain Gustave Ross and grandson of New York Supreme Court Justice William P. Burr, was born at 1220 Park Avenue and raised on the Upper East Side of New York and Westport. He spent his school years at the Fairfield Country Day School in Fairfield and Westport, Connecticut. Subsequently, he attended Le Chalet Marie-José private boarding school in Gstaad, Switzerland. Ross completed his school education at the Millbrook School with Edward Pulling as his mentor and then attended college (Collegiate School) in New York.

Ross studied history and philosophy at Columbia University in New York. From 1955 to 1976, Ross was a partner at Brooks Harvey, which was then acquired by Morgan Stanley. He entered a partnership with Harry Helmsley, and in 1969 they founded a company together. As an investment banker he went to South America for two years and represented the interests of Southern Railroad, Venezuela, while his sister, Vassar graduate and New York socialite Sheilah Ross, worked as a photo and cover model for Vogue and Harper's Bazaar in New York. In the mid-1970s Ross returned to the United States and devoted himself to sculpture and collecting Imperial European military art and antiques from the period of Waterloo to 1914.

Ross has been awarded several design awards, such as the A'Design Award and the IDA Design Award. In 2016, he was made Hon. life fellow of the Royal Society of Arts (FRSA) and was officially selected artist for the annual summer exhibition of the Royal Scottish Academy of Art and Architecture in Edinburgh. In the same year, Ross was nominated for the German Design Award in Frankfurt.

== Work ==
Christopher Ross’ wearable luxury art collection Animal Instinct is a series of animal-inspired, limited edition pieces intricately crafted by the artist himself from antique sterling silver, 24-karat gold and his signature Bohemian glass eyes.

His wearable fine art and portrait sculpture has been featured in films, books and numerous international high-end fashion and luxury lifestyle magazines such as Vogue, L'Officiel, Madame Figaro, Elle France, Harper’s Bazaar and magazine covers such as Marie Claire and Malaysia Tatler. His jewellery has been seen in fashion and art shows, most recently at Fendi’s Limited Edition Experiences, Art Basel in Miami Beach 2009, Vendôme Luxury Paris 2010 and in 2016, at the Royal Scottish Academy of Art and Architecture in Edinburgh. His work was shown by the American fashion designer Rachel Roy at her Autumn/Winter Digital Runway Show 2013/2014, in New York City.

== Public collections ==
The Hermitage Museum, Saint Petersburg, Russia; Musée Palais Galliera, Paris, France; The Metropolitan Museum of Art, New York; The National Museums of Scotland, Edinburgh; Yale University Art Gallery; The Newark Museum of Art; Kent State University Museum and MFA Boston Museum of Fine Arts. Other collections are on view at Chisholm Gallery in Wellington, Florida, USA.

== Collector connoisseur ==
Christopher Ross was a lifetime collector of 19th-century military art and antiques of the five major European empires; The French First and Second Empire; the Austro-Hungarian and German empires; Russia of the Czars and the British Empire including the Raj.

At nine years old, Ross was inspired by his father—who fought as a soldier in the trenches at the Somme, Ypres and Château-Thierry during World War I—who took him to Bannerman's Castle and warehouse of army surplus, which ultimately led him to become a serious collector of the Imperial period.

During the 1980s and '90s, Ross became an adviser to Diana Vreeland and subsequently Richard Martin and Harold Koda of the Metropolitan Museum of Art in New York and objects from his private collection were on loan for several exhibitions including The Imperial Style: Fashions of the Hapsburg Era: Austria-Hungary (1979-1980), The Age of Napoleon (1989-1990) and Swords into Ploughshares (1995). The Nassau County Museum of Art in Roslyn Harbor, Long Island also used some of his historical pieces for their exhibition Napoleon And His Age in 2001.

In September 1994, Prince Michael of Kent visited Ross' New York residence, to view his Tsarist military art collection, as he was doing research for one of his A&E documentary series on Nicolai II Alexandrovich Romanov, the last Tsar of Russia.

In 2008–2009, Ross wrote and directed a 68min. HD documentary film called Sweet Compulsion - A Collector's Odyssey: a luminous portrait of a passionate and eccentric collector connoisseur, which was shot by Viennese cinematographer Richard Ladkani and shown at Art Basel-Miami in 2009–2010.

== Honours and awards ==
Grand Cross of the Order of Merit of the Portuguese Royal House.

Knight of the Order of Saints Maurice and Lazarus of the Royal House of Savoy.

== Club memberships ==
Christopher Ross was a seasoned club man, having been a lifelong member of the Racquet and Tennis Club at 370 Park Avenue, New York; the Squadron A Association, New York and the Cavalry & Guards Club in London, United Kingdom.

== Press, catalogues and directories ==
- Algemeines Künstlerlexikon - Internationale Künstlerdatenbank (AKL–IKD). Walter De Gruyter GmbH, BERLIN/GERMANY, 2021
- Ulrich Goette Himmelblau: Who's Who in Visual Art / 100 Top Fine Artists of Our Day. Art Domain Publisher, QUEDLINBURG/GERMANY, 2017 ISBN 978-3-9817701-2-4
- GrupoDuplex: Joyería Contemporánea. BARCELONA/SPAIN, 2016 Dep. Legal.: SA-555-2011
- DesignerPress: Award Winning Product & Industrial Design. Vol. 14-P, p. 67, COMO/ITALY, 2016 ISBN 978-88-97977-11-7
- DesignerPress: Award Winning Designs 2015-2016 A'Design Award YearBook. Digital Edition Book – PDF, COMO/ITALY, 2016
- The Jones Group: Rachel Roy. Custom Digital Runway Lookbook. NEW YORK CITY/USA, 2014
- Vendôme Luxury Collection. Exhibition Catalogue. Hôtel d'Évreux, 19 Place Vendôme, PARIS/FRANCE, 2010
- Studio XXb: BrickWorld. Exhibition Catalogue. Le Meurice, PARIS/FRANCE, 2010
- Judy Aldridge: Lurve Paris-Berlin; Hedonism. Bi-annual Collectible Edition Nr. 2, PARIS/FRANCE, 2009/2010
- Dacra, Design Miami/, Art Basel Miami Beach, Miami Design District, Exhibition Guide & Map, p. 4, Miami Beach, FLORIDA/USA, 2009/2010
- Hans Deumling: More Favourite Things. Eduard Meier GmbH, MUNICH/GERMANY, 2008
- Agostino von Hassell: Military High Life, Elegant Food Histories and Recipes, University Press of the South Inc., New Orleans, LOUISIANA/USA, 2006 ISBN 978-1931948609
- Cathy Newman: National Geographic fashion, p. 106-108. National Geographic Society, Washington, D.C./USA, 2001 ISBN 0-7922-6416-9
- Richard Martin, Harold Koda: Swords into Ploughshares. The Metropolitan Museum of Art, NEW YORK/USA, 1995 ISBN 978-0300201369
- Christopher Buckley: Dressed to Kill. An Extraordinary Collection of Military Regalia fills a Manhattan Town House. Photography: Billy Cunningham. Architectural Digest - Special New York Issue. Architectural Digest Publishing Corp., Los Angeles, California/USA, 11/1992
- Aardvark Publishing: The Great Bermuda Catalogue. HAMILTON/BERMUDA, 1987 ISBN 978-0960654215
- Audra D.S Burch: Limited Edition Experiences turns Design District into style mecca. In: The Miami Herald, FLORIDA/USA, 12/2009
- Kyra Brenzinger: Christopher Ross, Un Artiste à Votre Taille. In: Gemme Paris, PARIS/FRANCE, 6/2010
- Royal Scottish Academy of Art & Architecture, Annual Exhibition, Christopher Ross Exhibition EDINBURGH/SCOTLAND
