= John Rochester Thomas =

American architect (1848–1901)

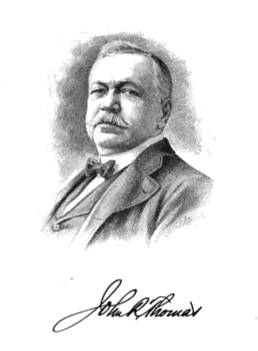
- Thomas c. 1899
- Born: June 18, 1848; Rochester, New York, US
- Died: August 28, 1901 (aged 53); Westminster Park, New York, US (Thousand Islands)
- Occupation: Architect
- Spouse: Julia Hortense (m. 1877)
- Children: 5
- Buildings: Surrogate's Courthouse; Rochester Theological Seminary; Willard Asylum for the Chronic Insane; Eastern Correctional Facility; Squadron A Armory; Calvary Baptist Church (Manhattan); First Baptist Church (Lynchburg, Virginia)

John Rochester Thomas (June 18, 1848 – August 28, 1901) was an American architect credited in his time with being the nation's most prolific designer of public and semi-public buildings.

His work was characterized by originality, moderation and dignity, according to The National Cyclopaedia of American Biography of 1899: "Judged by the artistic quality of his work and by his achievements in accomplishing repeatedly what others have declared impossible, he well deserves the title of America's leading architect."

Among his works are college buildings, prisons, armories, dozens of churches, and New York's Surrogate's Courthouse, his early 20th century Beaux Arts masterpiece based on his award-winning plan for a new city hall for New York City which was never constructed.

== Early life ==
Thomas was born in Rochester, New York on June 18, 1848, where he was educated in the city's schools until 1862, when his father's business failure obliged him to seek employment.

He decided to become an architect and entered the office of Merwin Austin of Rochester, subsequently pursuing a university course under the direction of Martin Brewer Anderson, president of the University of Rochester. After spending some time studying the architecture of European countries, Thomas entered professional practice in Rochester in 1868.

In 1877 he married Julia Hortense. They had four daughters and one son.

== Buildings ==
Notable buildings designed by Thomas and erected between 1870 and 1880 include Sibley Hall of the University of Rochester, the buildings of the Rochester Theological Seminary, and the natural history museum, Brooks Hall, of the University of Virginia.

In 1874 John Adams Dix, governor of New York, appointed him architect and sole commissioner for the erection of the state reformatory at Elmira, under a special law. This was the first instance in New York where this method of fixing individual responsibility had been tried. He was retained in office by Gov. Samuel J. Tilden, and saved the state about $1,000,000. The reformatory prison erected was considered a model the world over.

=== Innovations ===
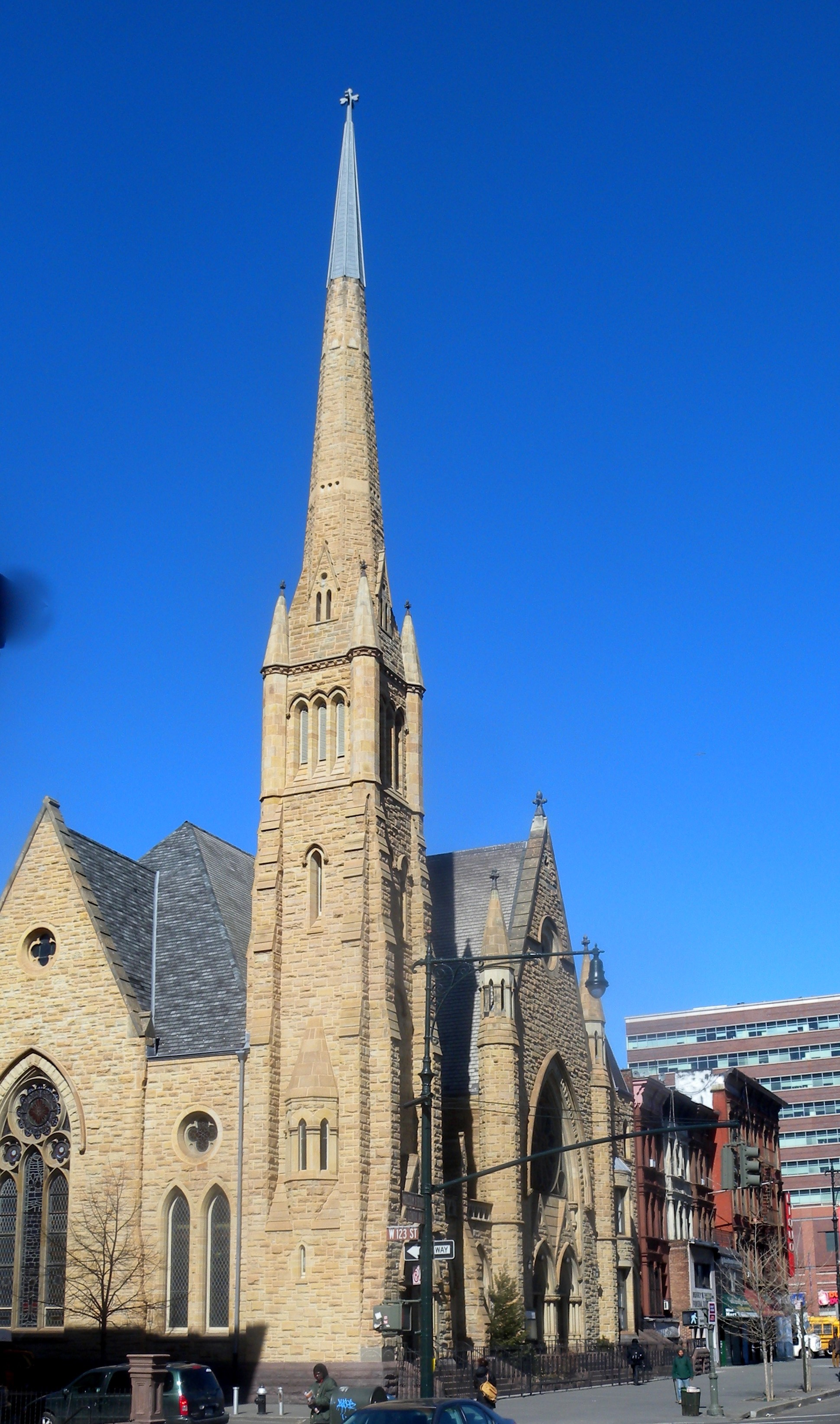
Second Reformed Dutch Church, 123rd Street & Lenox Avenue, Harlem

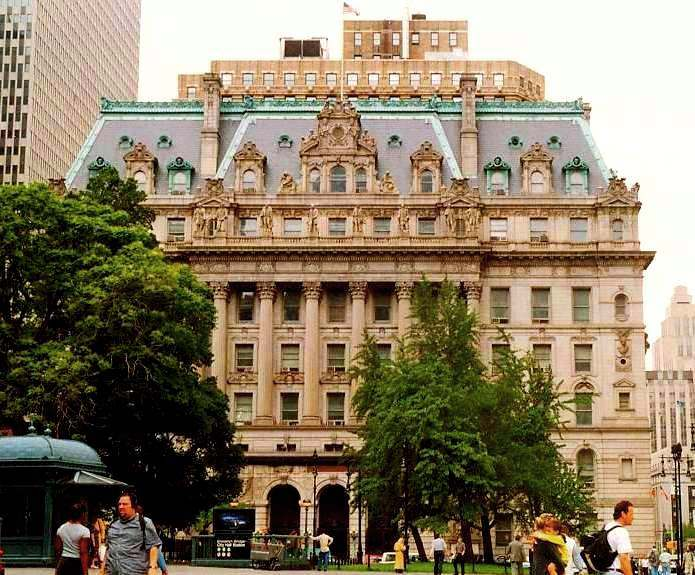
The Surrogate's Courthouse (Hall of Records) in Manhattan, New York City

In 1882 Thomas moved to New York City. In the combined armories of the 71st Regiment and 2d Battery (1893) he accomplished a feat never before attempted — the construction of two drill rooms, one above the other, free from all columns, 150 by 200 feet (46 by 61 metres) in area.

In rebuilding the New York Stock Exchange in 1886, Thomas successfully used an iron plate girder 102 feet (31 m) long in order to dispense with columns in the large board room, against the judgment of other experts. It was in this stock exchange work that the first iron caisson construction work was used in connection with building foundations.

In the Hays Building on Maiden Lane he first used the cantilever girder construction for distributing the load on the foundations, a system thereafter very much in vogue.

=== Prisons and armories ===
In addition to the Elmira reformatory, Thomas was architect for the Willard Asylum at Seneca Lake, New York, one of the largest in the country (1872); the New Jersey State Reformatory at Rahway (1899); and the Eastern New York Reformatory, near Ellenville (1899).

Probably his most popular work was the picturesque 1895 8th Regiment and Squadron "A" armory, in red brick and red terracotta, which was called one of the ornaments of New York. The building originally took up an entire city block but only the Madison Avenue facade still stands today.

=== Churches ===
More than 150 churches have been erected from his designs. Some of his city churches, such as the now-demolished Calvary Baptist Church on West 57th Street and the Reformed Low Dutch Church of Harlem (1887; now Ephesus Seventh Day Adventist Church) on Lenox Avenue at 123rd Street in Harlem, New York, are highly picturesque. He also designed the First Baptist Church of Lynchburg, Virginia.

=== Surrogate's Courthouse ===
In February 1896 the Municipal Building Commission of New York City awarded first prize to Thomas, out of over 130 designs submitted to them from all over the world for a new municipal building, involving an outlay of $25,000,000. The prize included his employment as architect for the building. The terms of the competition were made purposely attractive in order to attract the best architectural talent, and were prepared by a body of experts composed of Richard M. Hunt, William R. Ware of Columbia College, and Edward H. Kendall. The state legislature subsequently forbade the city authorities to remove the old city hall, thus preventing the erection of the contemplated building. This action led to a proposal for the erection of a new Hall of Records on an adjoining site, budgeted at $5,000,000, intended in its construction and art details to be equal to the best that could be produced.

Thomas adapted his design and construction began in 1899, but was incomplete when Thomas died in 1901. The building was completed by Horgan & Slattery at a total cost in excess of $7,000,000. It opened in 1907. The building contains one of the city's finest Beaux Arts interiors.

== Publications ==
In November 1883 Thomas read a paper on "Church Architecture" before a conference of clergymen in Boston. This was followed in October 1891 by The History of Prison Architecture, read before the National Prison Association of the United States at its annual congress at Pittsburgh, which was universally adopted as the standard. An article on proposed legislation restricting the height of buildings in New York City was read before the New York Chamber of Commerce in 1896.

== Civic associations ==
Thomas was a member of the New York Chamber of Commerce; the New York Yacht Club; the Architectural League; the Sculpture Society; the National Arts Club; the Manhattan Club, and the executive committee of the New York Prison Association. He was also a member of the Kane Lodge of the Free and Accepted Masons.

Although still a resident of New York City, he died at Westminster Park, New York, in the Thousand Islands, on August 28, 1901.
