= Taylor Cassidy =

African American internet personality

- Born: January 28, 2003 (age 23)
- Occupation: Social media influencer

TikTok information
- Page: Taylor Cassidy
- Years active: 2019–present
- Genre: Educational
- Followers: 2.2 million
- Last updated: October 13, 2025

Taylor Cassidy (born January 28, 2003) is an American media personality and educator, best known for her series "Fast Black History".

== Education ==
Cassidy, who is from St. Louis, Missouri, grew up learning about African-American history from her parents. In elementary school, she became dissatisfied with the fact that the only Black history in her school textbook was about slavery. She graduated high school in 2021, and then took a gap year before entering college.

As of 2023, Cassidy was a film student at New York University.

== Career ==
Cassidy began making TikTok videos in November 2019. She created her series "Fast Black History" in February 2020, for Black History Month. Profiled figures included Maya Angelou, Shirley Chisholm, and Fannie Lou Hamer. Later videos discussed Black Wall Street, the Black Fives, Mum Bet, and Zelda Wynn Valdés.

Cassidy also created content to raise awareness of racial injustice, and a series called "Black Girl Magic Minute," which uplifts contemporary Black creators.

In 2021 Cassidy signed with WME and became a host of TikTok Radio on SiriusXM. She also works with Nickelodeon as a Nick News correspondent.

As of February 2023, Cassidy had 2.2 million followers on TikTok. In March 2023, Cassidy was invited to the United Nations General Assembly as part of the International Day of Remembrance of the Victims of Slavery and the Transatlantic Slave Trade. Cassidy and keynote speaker Djamila Ribeiro also visited the Ark of Return, a memorial to victims of slavery.

Cassidy released the book Black History is Your History in October 2025.

== Recognition ==
Cassidy was recognized as one of TikTok's top 10 Voices of Change: Most Impactful Voices for 2020. That same year, she was given a special creator honor at the Streamy Awards by Liza Koshy. In 2021, she was included as one of Teen Vogue's 21 Under 21.

In November 2023, Cassidy and her fellow Nick News hosts were collectively nominated for the 2nd annual Children's and Family Emmy Awards in the category Outstanding Host.

Cassidy was recognized on the 2025 TIME100 Creators list.
