= United Nations Permanent Forum on People of African Descent =

UN coordinating body

- Abbreviation: PFPAD
- Formation: 2 August 2021; 4 years ago
- Type: Intergovernmental organization, Regulatory body, Advisory board
- Legal status: Active
- Headquarters: New York City, USA
- Head: President; Epsy Campbell Barr, Costa Rica
- Parent organization: United Nations Human Rights Council
- Website: https://www.ohchr.org/en/permanent-forum-people-african-descent

The United Nations Permanent Forum on People of African Descent is an entity of the United Nations whose purpose is to contribute to the political, economic, and social inclusion of Afro-descendant individuals.

It was created by consensus of the UN General Assembly on August 2, 2021, through resolution 75/3141 at the request of the former Vice President of Costa Rica, Epsy Campbell Barr, as "a consultative mechanism for people of African descent and other relevant stakeholders as a platform for improving the safety and quality of life and livelihoods of people of African descent, as well as an advisory body to the Human Rights Council, in line with the programme of activities for the implementation of the International Decade for People of African Descent and in close coordination with existing mechanisms".

The forum is preceded by resolution 69/16 of November 18, 2014, titled "Programme of Activities for the Implementation of the International Decade for People of African Descent" with the aim of creating such an organism. It is composed of five members selected by governments and five appointed by the UN Human Rights Council.

== Background ==
In November 2014, the United Nations General Assembly decided to establish a forum as a consultative mechanism to ensure the inclusive participation of Member States, UN funds and programs, specialized agencies, civil society organizations representing Afro-descendants, and other stakeholders. This decision was made within the framework of the Program of Activities for the Implementation of the International Decade for People of African Descent, as outlined in resolution A/RES/69/16.

In December 2018, the General Assembly, through resolution A/RES/73/262, reaffirmed its intention by establishing a Permanent Forum on People of African Descent, to serve as a consultative mechanism for Afro-descendants and other interested parties. The forum aims to improve the quality of life and livelihoods of Afro-descendant individuals and contribute to the development of a United Nations declaration on the promotion and full respect of the human rights.

Between 2015 and 2018, consultations and contributions were undertaken to determine the modalities, format, and substantive and procedural aspects of the Permanent Forum. Subsequent resolutions by the Human Rights Council and the General Assembly further elaborated on these modalities. In May 2019, the Office of the High Commissioner for Human Rights (OHCHR), in collaboration with the Permanent Mission of Costa Rica in Geneva, organized a one-day consultation on the forum. This consultation attracted over 200 participants, including representatives from governments, UN agencies, civil society, and Afro-descendants from various regions.

== Mandate ==
Resolution 75/314 of the General Assembly outlines the modalities, format, and substantive and procedural aspects of the Forum. Its mandate includes contributing to the full political, economic, and social inclusion of Afro-descendants, providing advice to the Human Rights Council and other UN bodies, exploring the possibility of drafting a UN declaration on the human rights of Afro-descendants, and analyzing best practices and challenges related to this population.

It is also responsible for monitoring the implementation of the International Decade for People of African Descent, promoting awareness and respect for the diversity of their heritage and culture, coordinating activities related to Afro-descendants at the UN, and supporting socio-economic development programs.

== Structure ==
The Permanent Forum on People of African Descent is chaired by two of its members, who hold the positions of president and vice-president during each session period, taking into consideration regional rotation and consulting with regional groups of Afro-descendants. The presidency and vice-presidency entail responsibilities such as presiding over sessions, coordinating joint sessions, representing the Forum at official events, and presenting reports to the General Assembly and the Human Rights Council.

Additionally, there is a rapporteur who may continue in the position in successive periods without rotation. This individual is responsible for drafting the annual report to the Human Rights Council and the General Assembly, collaborating with the presidency, vice-presidency, other members, and the Forum's secretariat. Furthermore, they prepare statements and project proposals in collaboration with other members and the secretariat.

Members
Position	Name	Country
Member	Ana Matarrita McCalla	Costa Rica
Vice-president	Alice Angèle Nkom	Cameroon
Rapporteur	Michael McEachrane	Sweden
Member	Gaynel Curry	Bahamas
Member	Justin Hansford	United States
Member	Hongjiang Huang	China
Member	Martin Kimani	Kenya
Member	Pastor Elías Murillo Martínez	Colombia
Member	Mona Omar	Egypt
President	June Soomer	Saint Lucia

== Sessions ==
The Permanent Forum on People of African Descent holds annual open sessions to address relevant issues, focusing on thematic topics related to its mandate. These sessions last for four working days and are held in a rotating manner at the United Nations Office in Geneva and the United Nations Headquarters, or at another location as decided by the Permanent Forum. These meetings are preferably organized after the sessions of the Working Group of Experts on People of African Descent or the Intergovernmental Working Group on the Effective Implementation of the Durban Declaration and Programme of Action.

States, UN mechanisms and bodies, intergovernmental organizations, national human rights institutions, universities, experts on Afro-descendant issues, and non-governmental organizations recognized by the Economic and Social Council can participate in these sessions. The participation of other non-governmental organizations, including those at the community level, that share the objectives and principles of the United Nations Charter is also encouraged. The Permanent Forum seeks equitable regional representation and participation, with a focus on the inclusion of women, youth, and underrepresented minorities to foster intergenerational and intersectional dialogue.

During the annual session periods, the forum allows both in-person and virtual participation. Thematic topics are examined in plenary sessions where works, plans, projects, proposals, preliminary observations, conclusions, and recommendations are presented and reports are discussed. It also encourages the organization of parallel events by civil society and other stakeholders on issues related to the rights, security, and quality of life of Afro-descendants.

Annual session periods may include side events or additional evening events, depending on available resources. Opening and closing ceremonies, as well as cultural and festive elements reflecting the rich cultural expression and heritage of Afro-descendants, are considered.

On the last day of each session period, the forum provides a summary of the debates with preliminary observations and recommendations, which are announced in a press release and, when appropriate, in a press conference.

== See also ==
=== Internal links ===
- History of slavery
- International Day for the Remembrance of the Slave Trade and its Abolition
- International Day of Remembrance of the Victims of Slavery and the Transatlantic Slave Trade
- United Nations Slavery Memorial
- United Nations Declaration of the Trafficking of Enslaved Africans and Racialized Chattel Enslavement of Africans as the Gravest Crime against Humanity
- International Decade for People of African Descent
