= Laura Facey =

Jamaican contemporary artist

Laura Facey CD
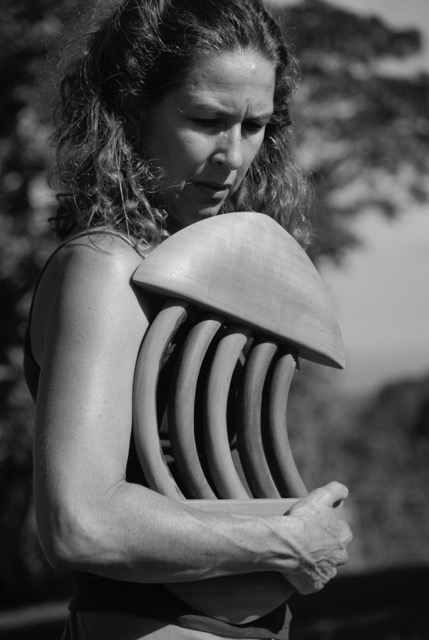
- Laura Facey, with Harp Arrow
- Born: 31 May 1954 (age 71); Kingston, Colony of Jamaica, British Empire
- Education: West Surrey College of Art & Design; Jamaica School of Art
- Known for: Sculpture, installation art

Laura Facey CD (born 31 May 1954) is a Jamaican contemporary artist. She is best known for the monumental sculpture Redemption Song (2003), which serves as Jamaica's national monument to the Emancipation from Slavery.

== Biography ==
Laura Facey was born in Kingston, Jamaica, to the Jamaican businessman Maurice Facey OJ who was also the founding Chairman of the National Gallery of Jamaica, and his spouse, book publisher Valerie Facey. Her father funded the National Gallery and also was committed to contributing to Jamaica through nation-building and the architecture of the New Kingston district. His death was deeply felt within the community of the National Gallery of Jamaica due to his leadership and support of his wife who went on to contribute to her country in her own ways. Laura Facey's now widowed mother is extremely dedicated to 'preserving Jamaica's heritage by mean of books,' and other contributions to architecture. Specifically Valerie Facey founded the Mill Press, which has 'produced memorable, award-winning books' about Jamaican art, poetry, biography, cuisine, history, and so much more. Laura Facey's family continues to instill the importance of representing their home country and giving a voice to the unheard, which is a central theme within Laura Faceys artwork.

Laura Facey was trained at the West Surrey College of Art & Design, Farnham, England, and the Jamaica School of Art in Kingston, Jamaica (now: the Edna Manley College of the Visual and Performing Arts) where she obtained a diploma in Sculpture in 1975.

Laura Facey lives in the hills of Saint Ann, Jamaica, where she combines her artwork with organic farming and community development work. In 2014, she received the Order of Distinction, Commander Class (CD), one of Jamaica's national honours.

== Work ==
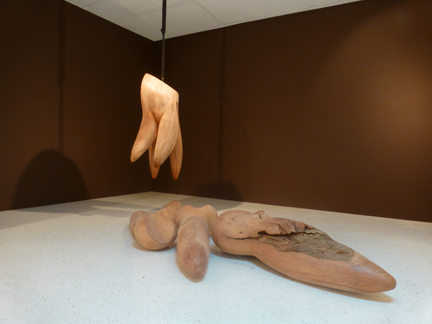
Laura Facey - De Hangin of Phibbah An Her Private Parts An De Bone Yard (2013)

As a sculptor, Laura Facey has worked in bronze, stone and unconventional materials such as Styrofoam, but she is best known for her work in woodcarving. She was one of the first artists in Jamaica to produce assemblage and installation art, often incorporating found objects with carved elements. She was featured in the National Gallery of Jamaica's Six Options: Gallery Spaces Transformed (1985), which was the first exhibition of installation art in Jamaica. Facey also works in drawing and fine art print media, and she has illustrated two children's books, both on environmental themes: Talisman the Goat (1976) and Chairworm and Supershark (1992). The latter was written by the maritime conservationist Elisabeth Mann Borgese.

The human body and the land, sea and natural bounty of Jamaica have provided Laura Facey with a range of metaphors to address themes of personal and collective trauma and of spiritual transformation, transcendence and healing. This is illustrated by her autobiographical mixed media installation The Goddess of Change (1993), in the collection of the National Gallery of Jamaica, and the life-size wood-carving of Christ Ascending (2001) which was commissioned for the St. Andrew Parish Church in Kingston, Jamaica. The latter is one of several religious artworks by Facey.

Her work with the aforementioned human body, is common in the portrayal of women and the pain, suffering, and abuses endured. One example of this would be her 1998 piece Surrender in which she uses wood to sculpt the beautiful female form while also capturing the pain, pity, and pleasure of it all. Facey is a storyteller who considers the good and the evil, 'between the beauty and the beast- where beauty is the ultimate winner,'. She has a specifically impactful piece that was commissioned by Small Axe as a part of 'The Visual Memory of Catastrophic History,' in which there is a wood sculpture De Hangin of Phibbah An Her Private Parts An De Bone Yard (2013). As the name describes there is a naked women being strung up, and where the rope connects is around her lower abdominal or reproductive system, as a 'metaphor to the atrocities done to women'. This gives a representation of the horrors done to women specifically slaves and the struggles other women endure relating to sexual abuse. This is addressing the previously mentioned collective themes and traumas of those without a voice.

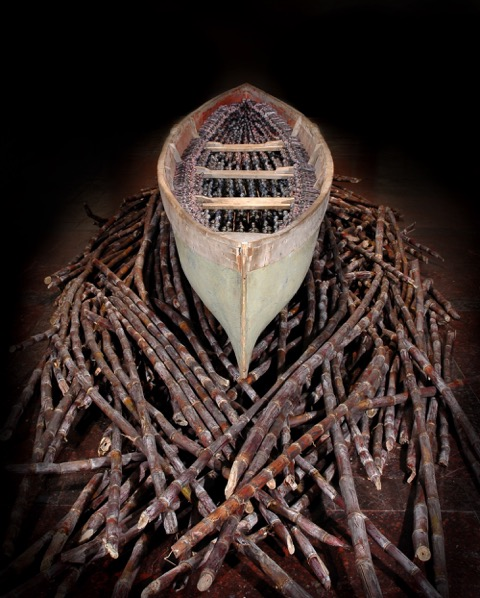
Laura Facey - Their Spirits Gone Before Them

Facey's work on the 2003 Emancipation monument marked the start of a sustained thematic interest in the legacy of plantation slavery, as an experience of collective trauma and a defining moment in Jamaican history. Her installation, Their Spirits Gone Before Them (2006), consists of a traditional Jamaican cottonwood dugout canoe resting on a "sea" of sugar cane and in which she mounted 1,357 resin figures (miniatures of the male and female figures of the Redemption Song monument). The work alludes to the Middle Passage as a key moment of trauma and transformation that birthed modern Caribbean society and culture. Their Spirits Gone Before Them was endorsed by UNESCO’s Slave Route Project and has been featured in several exhibitions, such as Facey's 2014 solo exhibition at the International Slavery Museum in Liverpool.

Scale is an important part of Facey's work, which ranges from miniature to monumental, and her artworks have a tactile, performative and interactive quality. Ceiba (2016), a giant drum made from a hollowed-out silk cotton tree trunk, was exhibited at the Jamaica Biennial 2017, where it was used for a performance at the opening function, and visitors were allowed to interact with it by beating the drum. The dramatic potential of shifting scale is also used in Facey's giant tool forms which exploit the symbolic potential of tools, as devices that build, mend, untangle and transport. Walking Tree, one of giant comb forms produced by Facey, which was first shown at the Jamaica Biennial 2014, was acquired by the Norman Manley International Airport in Kingston, Jamaica, where it is on permanent view in the ticketing hall.

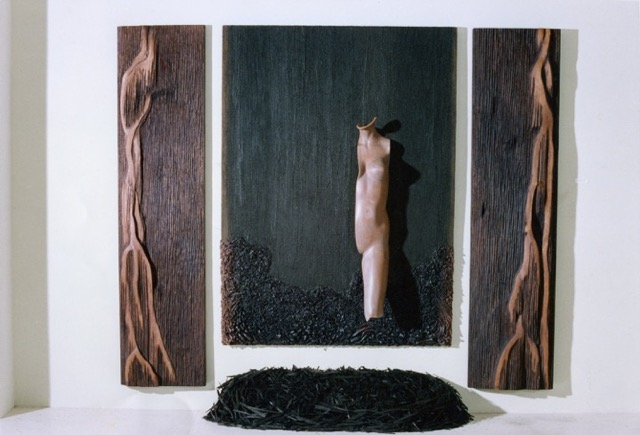
Laura Facey - Goddess of Change (1993), Collection: National Gallery of Jamaica

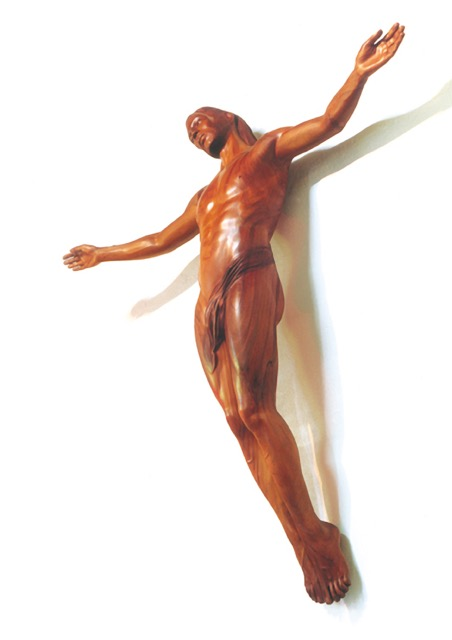
Laura Facey - Christ Ascending (2001), St Andrew Parish Church, Kingston, Jamaica

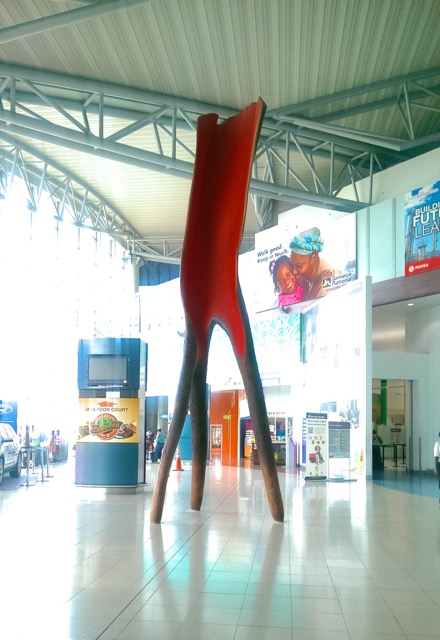
Laura Facey - Walking Tree (2012), Norman Manley International Airport, Kingston, Jamaica

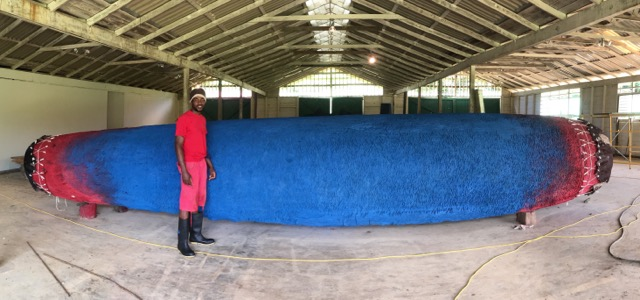
Laura Facey - Ceiba (2016), in Facey's studio in St Ann, Jamaica

== Redemption Song ==
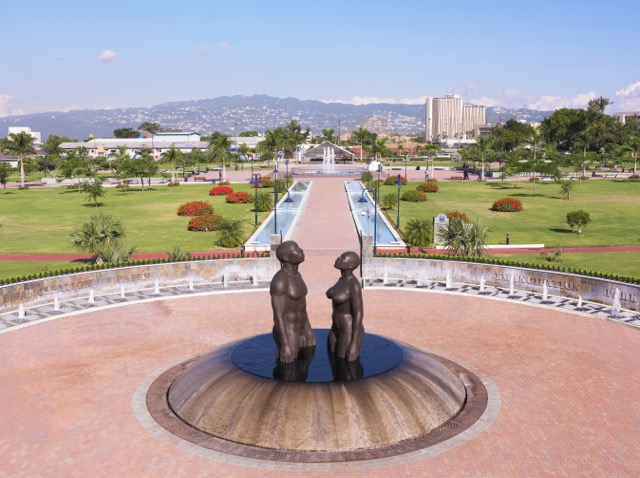
Laura Facey - Redemption Song (2003), Emancipation Park, Kingston, Jamaica

In 1997, Jamaica re-instituted 1 August as the annual Emancipation Day holiday, after it had been subsumed under the annual 6 August Independence Day Holiday since Independence in 1962. This was part of a broader campaign to re-position the end of slavery as a defining moment in Jamaican history. Related initiatives included the establishment of the new Emancipation Park in Kingston, which was developed by the Jamaican National Housing Trust and which opened in 2002.

A sculpture competition for the park was launched and the winning entry was Laura Facey's Redemption Song, which is named after Bob Marley’s Redemption Song and inspired by the line 'none but ourselves can free our minds'. Redemption Song, which was unveiled on the eve of Emancipation Day, on 31 July 2003, consists of two nude bronze figures, male and female, who stand in a round pool of water, which is part of the monument's fountain base, and who gaze up to the sky. Laura Facey outlined her intent in the programme brochure for the unveiling: 'My piece is not about ropes, chains or torture; I have gone beyond that. I wanted to create a sculpture that communicates transcendence, reverence, strength and unity through our pro-creators—man and woman—all of which comes when the mind is free'.

While intended as a hopeful and unifying image of spiritual transcendence and healing, Redemption Song did not find favour with all and the resulting controversy lasted for several months and reached the international media. The debate revolved mainly around the nudity, passivity and lack of historical specificity of the statues, as well as around the identity of the artist as a light-skinned Jamaican, and whether these choices were appropriate for a public monument to Emancipation. These criticisms still linger today though the monument is now an established Kingston landmark.

The recent restoration efforts of The Redemption Song have made many unprofessional errors without consulting Laura Facey Cooper before hand. The fingers of the man and women and the walls of the pool were starting to accumulate build-ups of calcium. The National Housing Trust (NHT) was in charge of these restorations and painted the sculpture with marine paint, which Facey said in distress, was a 'terrible mistake', and the NHT should consult the artist every step of the way before making changes. Facey explains that art restoration is a highly specialized field and they should have sought out professional experts before proceeding. Facey then sought out this help to return the monument to its original finish of patina to minimize permanent damage that could have been irreversible.

== Exhibitions ==
Solo Exhibitions

- 2018 - Laura Facey, Harmony Hall, Tower Isle, St Mary, Jamaica
- 2014 - Their Spirits, International Slavery Museum, Liverpool, UK
- 2013 - Radiant Earth, The Prince's School of Traditional Arts, London, UK
- 2011 - Radiant Combs, Mt Plenty, St Ann, Jamaica
- 2010 - Propel, ROKTOWA, Kingston, Jamaica
- 2006 - The Everything Doors, Institute of Jamaica, Kingston, Jamaica
- 2001 - Silent Voices, Bolivar Gallery, Kingston, Jamaica
- 1985 - Pieces, Mutual Life Gallery, Kingston, Jamaica
- 1980 - Works, Tom Martin Gallery, Santa Fe, New Mexico, USA

Group Exhibitions

- 2017, 2014 - Jamaica Biennial, National Gallery of Jamaica
- 2012, 2010 - National Biennial, National Gallery of Jamaica
- 2011 - About Change, World Bank, Washington DC, USA
- 2007 - Materialising Slavery, National Gallery of Jamaica
- 1997 - Sexta Bienal de la Habana, Havana, Cuba
- 1990 - Laura Facey & Cecil Ward, Patoo Gallery, Kingston, Jamaica
- 1986 - Caribbean Art Now, Commonwealth Institute, London, UK
- 1985 - Six Options: Gallery Spaces Transformed, National Gallery of Jamaica

== Commissions ==
- 2003 - Redemption Song, Monument to Emancipation, Emancipation Park, Kingston, Jamaica
- 2000 - Christ Ascending, St. Andrew Parish Church, Kingston, Jamaica
- 1999 - Earth to Earth, Sculpture Garden, University of Technology, Kingston, Jamaica

== Awards ==
- 2014 - Order of Distinction, Commander Rank (CD), Jamaican National Honours
- 2010 - Aaron Matalon Award, National Biennial, National Gallery of Jamaica
- 2006 - Silver Musgrave Medal, Institute of Jamaica
