= Dany Bébel-Gisler =

French sociologist, linguist and ethnographer

- Born: Dany Bébel; 7 April 1935; Pointe-à-Pitre, Guadeloupe
- Died: 28 September 2003 (aged 68); Lamentin, Guadeloupe
- Occupations: sociologist, ethnologist, linguistic activist, writer
- Years active: 1960–2013
- Known for: preservation and education about Guadeloupean Creole

Dany Bébel-Gisler (7 April 1935 – 28 September 2003) was an Afro-Guadeloupean writer and sociolinguist who specialized in Antillean Creole and ethnology. She was one of the first linguists to defend the preservation and teaching of Creole languages and study how the interplay of the lingua franca of the Caribbean reflected the social hierarchy, as well as the assimilation or lack thereof of both the colonizers and colonized. She was instrumental in the development of UNESCO's The Slave Route Project, tracing the intersection of African, Caribbean and European cultures and published several novels and children's books on Guadeloupean culture.

== Early life ==
Dany Bébel was born on 7 April 1935 in Pointe-à-Pitre on the island of Guadeloupe in the French Antilles. Her father's family owned a sugar plantation in Guadeloupe and her mother was a mulatto woman who was an agricultural worker on the plantation. Growing up on her grandfather's sugarcane plantation, she was encouraged to pursue her educational dreams in France. During her teens, she moved to France and attended a preparatory school in Toulouse. She then went on to study at the École Normale Supérieure in Paris. When she graduated, Bébel became the first person in her mother's family to have earned her baccalauréat. Receiving the Prix Spécial de Français, she went on to study at the Grandes écoles, under the tutelage of Michel Leiris, focusing on ethnology, linguistics and sociology.

== Career ==
Bébel-Gisler began working in France in the 1960s, while she was completing her university studies. She taught in Nanterre and Aubervilliers, focusing on educating immigrants and working-class students. She led an adult literacy program in Paris, which targeted African and Algerian immigrants. In 1976, she returned to Guadeloupe with the goal of launching an experimental teaching project for rural residents living in the area around Lamentin. Her target group was illiterate adults who were not French-speaking, so that she could create a spelling system for the local Creole language. At the time, there were few Creole texts that did not look at the language from an etymological analysis standpoint. Publishing a booklet, Kèk Prinsip Pou Ékri Kréyól (Some Principles for Writing in Kreol), in 1975, she proposed designing a notational system for Guadeloupean Creole based upon the Haitian model which had been developed, but which could be researched, refined, and applied to create a written standard for educational purposes. In 1976, she published La Langue créole, force jugulée (The Creole language, forced suppression), which evaluated the system in French schools which placed immigrant children in remedial classes because they could not speak standard French. Removing them from regular classes, she believed, caused students to feel inferior and impacted their further education and later their ability to get jobs. Thus, language, rather than being a commonality between peoples became a means of maintaining social boundaries.

In 1979, Bébel-Gisler founded the alternative-educational Centre d'Education Populaire Bwadoubout, to provide literacy for disadvantaged adults or children who wanted access to learning, but may have been obstructed because formal schools taught only in French. She directed the center and received funding from the French National Center for Scientific Research, though in effect, her work at Bwadoubout undermined the governmental objectives of assimilation. Language became a vehicle for activism, for Bébel-Gisler, who recognized that controlling access to knowledge insured that certain social classes or those with certain backgrounds controlled the power. By refusing to use French, Guadeloupeans were creating a distinction between themselves, their colonizer, and other Antillean colonies, as well as rejecting assimilation.

In addition to her educational efforts, Bébel-Gisler began publishing novels. In 1985, her biographical novel Lénora: l’histoire enfouie de la Guadeloupe (Leonora: the buried story of Guadeloupe) described the period between 1940 and 1943, when Governor Constant Sorin instituted policies to isolate Guadeloupe and Martinique from the potentiality of American or British occupation, leading to widespread suffering on the islands. The book was released in English in 1994 and she published the children's book, Grand'mère, ça commence où la Route de l'esclave? (Grandmother, where does the Slave Route begin?) in 1998. The book retraced the slave triangle and was a means of acknowledging the past and its impact on history. In 2000, she published, À la recherche d’une odeur de grand’mère; D’en Guadeloupe une « enfant de la Dass » raconte… (In Search of Grandmother's Smell: Tales from a "child of the Dass" in Guadeloupe). The book tells how the sugar plantation shaped both the landscape and the people who worked within it, replacing family ties with communal relationships and changing the nature of the relationships between men and women and parents and children. It explores the competing themes prevalent in Guadeloupean society where matrifocality and patriarchy meet.

In 1996, Bébel-Gisler became affiliated with UNESCO's The Slave Route Project, tracing the intersection of African, Caribbean and European cultures through the monuments of the slave trade. She was responsible for documenting the Caribbean portion of the route. Bringing the project to Guadeloupe, she identified eighteen significant extant sites including plantations, forts, and jails.

== Death and legacy ==
Bébel-Gisler died unexpectedly of a heart attack on 28 September 2003 at her home in Lamentin. She is widely remembered for her activism in preserving Guadeloupean Creole.
