= Emancipation Day =

Holiday to celebrate emancipation of enslaved people

Emancipation Day is observed in many former European colonies in the West Indies and parts of the United States on various dates to commemorate the emancipation of slaves of African descent.

In much of the former British West Indies, Emancipation Day is usually marked on 1 August, commemorating the anniversary of the Slavery Abolition Act 1833 coming into force on 1 August 1834. However, in some countries, it is marked instead on the first Monday in August. The observance of a holiday in the British West Indies also became a key mobilisation tool and holiday for the antislavery movement in the United States.

Emancipation Day is also observed in other areas in regard to the abolition of other forms of involuntary servitude.

== 1 August or the first Monday in August ==
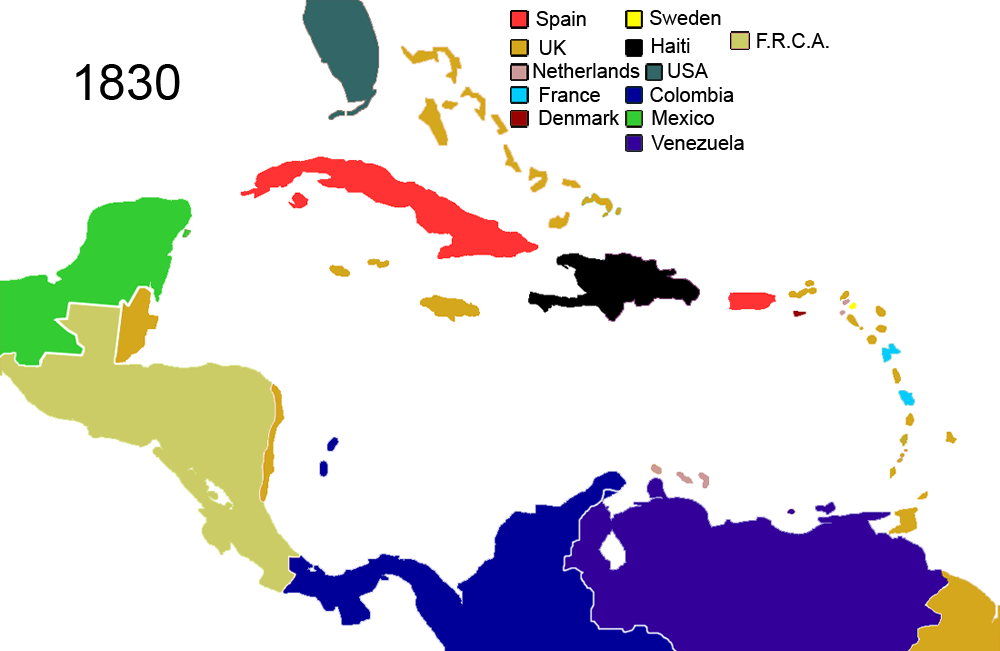
Political geography of the Caribbean and Central America, 1830

The Slavery Abolition Act 1833 abolished slavery throughout most of the British Empire. Exceptions to the act included the territories administered by the East India Company, the islands of Ceylon and Saint Helena. The act came into force for these exceptions in 1843.

The legislation only freed slaves below the age of six. Enslaved people older than six years of age were re-designated as "apprentices" and required to work 40 hours per week without pay, as part of compensation payment to their former owners. Full emancipation was finally achieved at midnight on 31 July 1838.

The holiday is known as August Monday in Guyana, Dominica, the Bahamas, and the British Virgin Islands, among other territories, as it is usually commemorated on the first Monday in August. Saint Lucia celebrates the holiday on 1 August.

=== Antigua and Barbuda ===
Antigua and Barbuda celebrates carnival on and around the first Monday of August. Since 1834 Antigua and Barbuda have observed the end of slavery. The first Monday and Tuesday in August was observed as a bank holiday so the populace can celebrate Emancipation Day. Monday is J'ouvert, a street party that mimics the early morning emancipation.

=== Anguilla ===
Anguilla: In addition to commemorating emancipation, it is the first day of "August Week", the Anguillian Carnival celebrations. J'ouvert is celebrated the Monday after 1 August, as Carnival commences.

=== The Bahamas ===
In the Bahamas, while Emancipation was historically observed on 1 August, the public holiday is observed on the first Monday in August and is, therefore, also colloquially referred to by the public as "August Monday". The public holiday has been observed in the Bahamas from as early as 1973, a month and a half after the country's independence.

Celebrations for Emancipation Day are traditionally centred in Fox Hill, Nassau, a former slave village. According to local folklore, the residents of Fox Hill learned of emancipation about a week after the rest of New Providence, giving rise to the community's distinctive Fox Hill Day celebrations.

Celebrations for the day are traditionally concentrated in, a former slave village whose inhabitants, according to folklore, heard about their freedom a week after everyone else on the island.

The day was also a day on which friendly societies marched to Government House and presented a list of grievances for the previous year. In 1938, seven to 800 people marched and demonstrated on 1 August for labour reforms a secret ballot at elections. Today, the Labour Day public holiday would more likely be chosen to express similar sentiments.

On the island as Eleuthera, the celebration known as the Bay Fest, close to Emancipation Day and lasting several days, is held in the settlement of Hatchet Bay on the island of Eleuthera, and "Back to the Bay" is held in the settlement of Tarpum Bay, also on Eleuthera.

=== Barbados ===
Emancipation Day in Barbados is part of the annual "Season of Emancipation", which began in 2005. The Season runs from 14 April to 23 August. Commemorations include:

- the anniversary of Bussa's rebellion, a major slave rebellion in 1816, 14 April
- National Heroes Day, 28 April;
- Crop Over festival, which includes May, June and the first week of August
- Africa Day, 25 May
- Day of National Significance, which commemorates the Labour Rebellion of 1937, 26 July
- Emancipation Day, 1 August
- birthday of Marcus Garvey, 17 August
- International Day for the Remembrance of the Slave Trade and its Abolition, 23 August

Emancipation Day celebrations usually feature a walk from Independence Square in Bridgetown to the Heritage Village at the Crop Over Bridgetown Market on the Spring Garden Highway. At the Heritage Village, in addition to a concert, there is a wreath-laying ceremony as a tribute to the ancestors. Traditionally, the Prime Minister, the Minister for Culture, and representatives of the Commission for Pan African Affairs are among those laying wreaths.

=== Belize ===
Starting in 2021, Belize joined other Caribbean nations in observing Emancipation Day on 1 August to commemorate the emancipation of enslaved people in the Caribbean in 1834.

=== Bermuda ===
Bermuda celebrates its Emancipation Day on the Thursday before the first Monday in August, placing it in either July or August.

==== Cup Match ====
Emancipation Day is marked by the Cup Match, a two-day public holiday and cricket match, played by residents of the island, is unique to Bermuda. Cup Match started when members of Friendly Societies and Lodges in Somerset in the west and St. George's Parish, in the east, gathered to mark the anniversary of the abolition of slavery. In 1902 a silver cup was introduced to the tournament, and that year the first official Cup Match cricket match was played on 12 June 1902. In the Public Holidays Act 1947 national public holidays were introduced on the Thursday and Friday before the first Monday in August, they were named Cup Match Day and Somers Day (named after George Somers, the founder of Bermuda). In 1999 Cup Match Day was renamed Emancipation Day, and Somers Day was renamed Mary Prince Day in February 2020 to remember Bermudan writer and enslaved woman Mary Prince.

=== British Virgin Islands ===
British Virgin Islands: The first Monday, Tuesday, and Wednesday of August are observed as Emancipation Monday, Emancipation Tuesday and Emancipation Wednesday, forming the principal public holidays of the British Virgin Islands Emancipation Festival.

=== Canada ===
In March 2021, the Canadian House of Commons voted unanimously on a motion to recognize 1 August as Emancipation Day across Canada. However, Black Canadian communities have commemorated Emancipation Day since the 1800s, most notably Black communities in the towns of Windsor, Owen Sound, Amherstburg, and Sandwich, in Ontario, and provinces including New Brunswick and Nova Scotia.

The first of August marks the day the Slavery Abolition Act 1833 ended slavery in the British Empire in 1834 and, thus, also in Canada. However, the first colony in the British Empire to have anti-slavery legislation was Upper Canada, now Ontario. John Graves Simcoe, the first Lieutenant Governor of Upper Canada, passed the 1793 Act Against Slavery, banning the importation of slaves and mandating that children born to enslaved women would be enslaved until they were 25 years old, as opposed to in perpetuity. This was the first jurisdiction in the British Empire to abolish the slave trade and limit slavery. The Act Against Slavery was superseded by the Slavery Abolition Act.

In 2022, the celebrations of Emancipation Day in Canada were declared a National Historic Event by Parks Canada.

==== Nova Scotia ====
Emancipation Day was set on 1 August by the Legislative Assembly of Nova Scotia on 13 April 2021. The event is marked with a provincial ceremony, as well as community-led events. Lieutenant Governor of Nova Scotia Arthur LeBlanc said in 2022, "as a province, we come together to renew our commitment to equity, peace, and dignity for all. We continue to structure our institutions and communities around the value of inclusion so that past harms are not repeated." The province also recognizes 23 August as the International Day for the Remembrance of the Slave Trade and its Abolition, in recognition of people of African descent in Haiti and the Dominican Republic fighting for their freedom in 1791.

==== Ontario ====
Moses Brantford Jr. leading an Emancipation Day parade down Dalhousie Street, Amherstburg, Ontario, 1894

In 2008, the provincial legislature designated 1 August as Emancipation Day. The act of parliament stated in its preamble: "it is important to recognize the heritage of Ontario's Black community and the contributions that it has made and continues to make to Ontario. It is also important to recall the ongoing international struggle for human rights and freedom from repression for persons of all races, which can be best personified by Lieutenant Governor John Graves Simcoe and Dr Martin Luther King Jr. Accordingly, it is appropriate to recognize 1 August formally as Emancipation Day and to celebrate it."

Notable Emancipation Day commemoration include The Big Picnic, organised by the Toronto Division of the Universal Negro Improvement Association (UNIA), which attracted thousands of attendees from the 1920s through to the 1950s. The first The Big Picnic was held in 1924, at Lakeside Park, in the community of Port Dalhousie.

In 1932, the first Emancipation Day Parade was held in Windsor and would come to be known as the "greatest freedom show on Earth". Organized by Walter Perry, the parade and festival boasted famous guests like Martin Luther King Jr, Mary McLeod Bethune, Stevie Wonder, Benjamin Mays, Fred Shuttlesworth, Martha Reeves and The Vandellas, and Eleanor Roosevelt. Though Perry's death in 1968 had a significant influence on the end of the tradition, fears over the Detroit Riot of 1967 caused the city's councillors to deny organizers necessary permits to stage an Emancipation Day celebration. Owen Sound has celebrated Emancipation with a picnic for 157 years, and now holds an Emancipation Festival.

Toronto hosts the Toronto Caribbean Carnival (known as Caribana until 2006), which is held the first Saturday in August of Civic Holiday, observed on the first Monday of August. Started in 1967, it is a two-week celebration culminating in the long weekend, with the Kings and Queens Festival, Caribana parade, and Olympic Island activities.

=== Cayman Islands ===
Following approval from Cabinet, Emancipation Day was reinstated after 62 years and is now being celebrated on the first Monday in May as a public holiday. May 5 in 2025 Other Caribbean nations celebrate Emancipation Day in August. The Cayman Islands celebrates in May as there was no mandatory apprenticeship for freemen. This is due to slave owners not registering with the British

=== Dominica ===
Dominica: The first Monday is celebrated as August Monday. It marks the end of slavery in 1834.

=== Grenada ===
Grenada: Prior to 2025, The first Monday of August was observed annually as Emancipation Day, with cultural activities commemorating the abolition of slavery. However the Grenadian government changed the celebrations to be on the first of August each year.

=== Guyana ===
Guyana: The first of August is celebrated as Emancipation Day with cultural activities and festivals. Families and communities gather to commemorate the occasion and traditional Creole dishes such as metemgee and cook-up rice are commonly enjoyed.

=== Jamaica ===
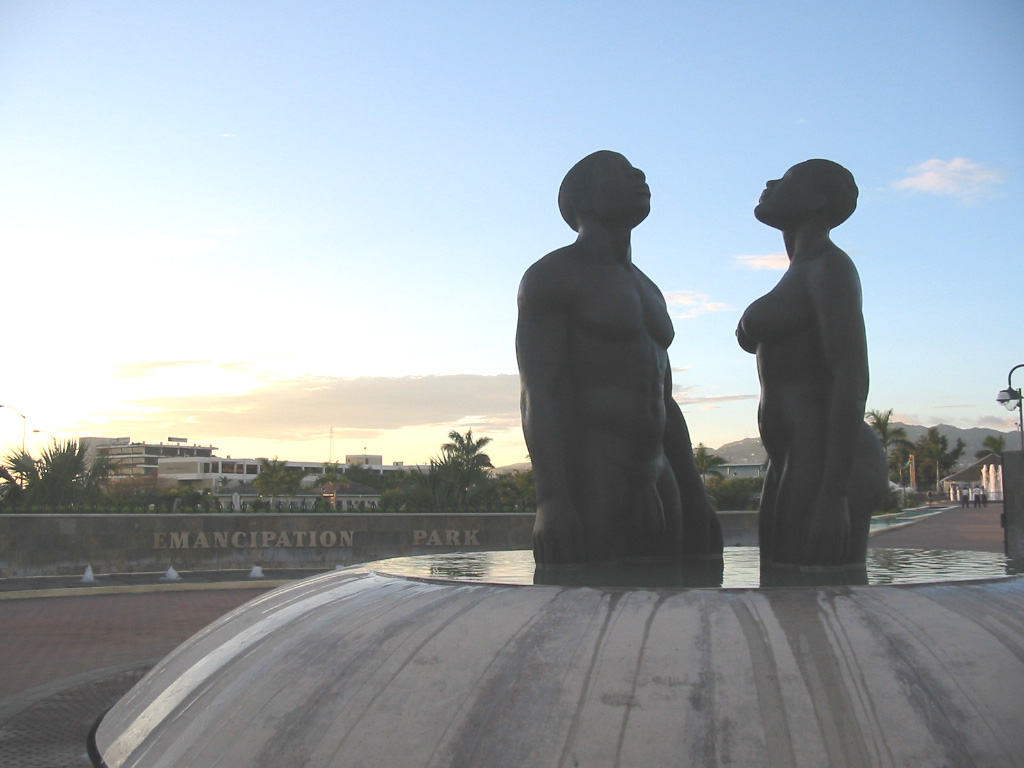
Redemption Song by Laura Facey (2003), Emancipation Park, Kingston, Jamaica

August 1st, Emancipation Day in Jamaica, is a public holiday and part of a week-long cultural celebration, during which Jamaicans also celebrate Jamaica Independence Day on 6 August 1962. Both August 1st and August 6th are public holidays.

Emancipation Day had stopped being observed as a nation holiday in 1962 at the time of independence. It was reinstated as a national public holiday under The Holidays (Public General) Act 1998 after a six-year campaign led by Rex Nettleford, among others.

Traditionally people would keep at vigil on 31 July and at midnight ring church bell and play drums in parks and public squares to re-enact the first moments of freedom for enslaved Africans. On Emancipation Day there is a reenactment of the reading of the Emancipation Declaration in town centres especially Spanish Town which was the seat of the Jamaican government when the Emancipation Act was passed in 1838.

Emancipation Park, a public park in Kingston, opened on the eve of Emancipation Day, 31 July in 2002, is named in commemoration of Emancipation Day.

=== Saint Kitts and Nevis ===
Saint Kitts and Nevis: The first Monday and Tuesday of August are celebrated as "Emancipation Day" and also "Culturama" in Nevis.

=== Saint Vincent and the Grenadines ===
Saint Vincent and the Grenadines also celebrates Emmancipation day annually on August 1.

The Act for the Abolition of Slavery in St. Vincent was transmitted to Britain on May 28, 1834. On the first of August in the year 1834, a total of 18,102 individuals who were previously enslaved transitioned into the status of apprentices.

A total of 2,959 children under the age of six were promptly released, along with 1,189 individuals who were either elderly or physically unable to care for themselves.

The enslaved individuals residing on the island of St. Vincent (SVG) were granted "complete emancipation" on August 1, 1838, following a period of "partial freedom" that was initially granted to them in 1834 through the enactment of the Abolition Act.

=== South Africa ===
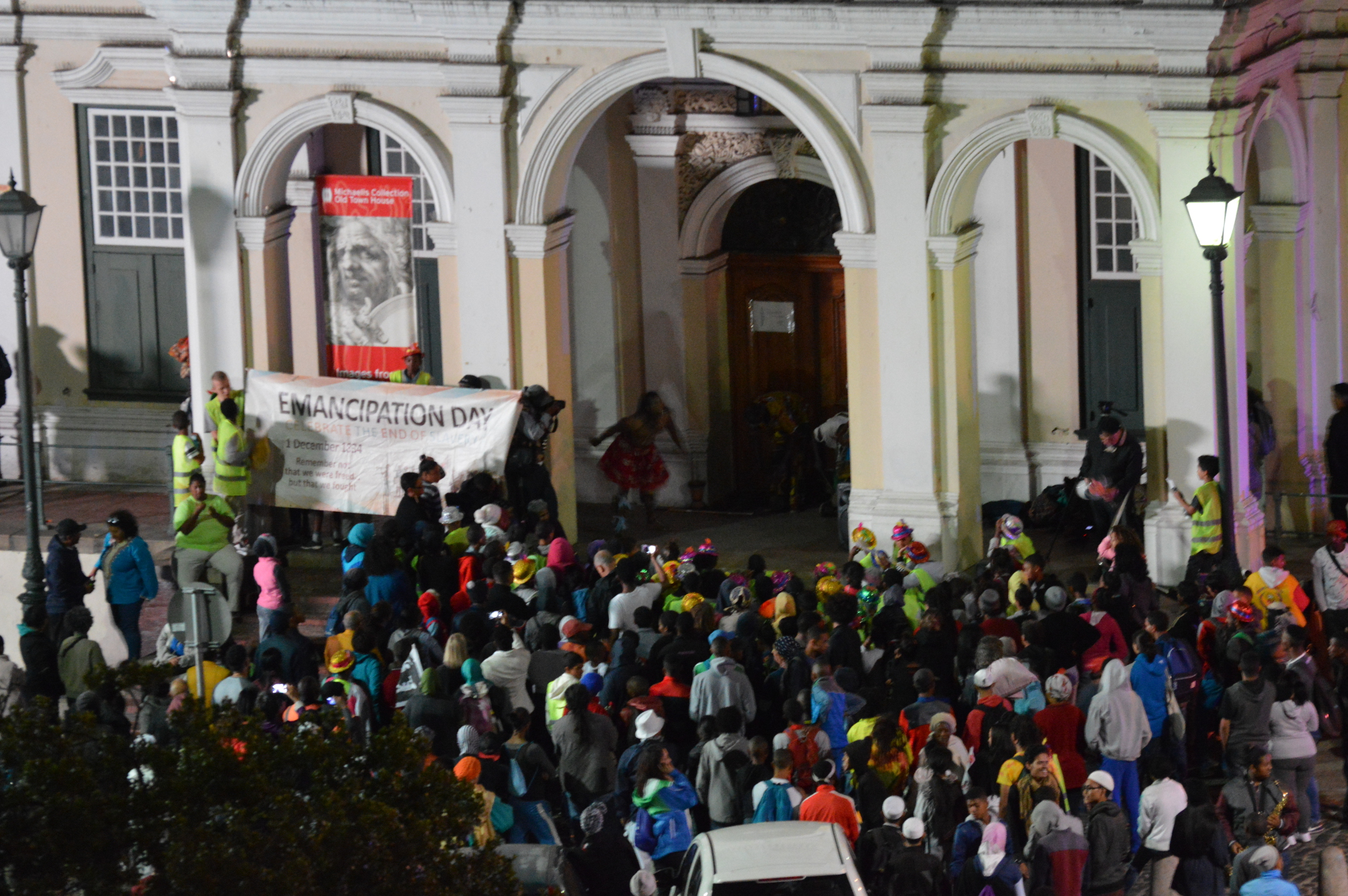
Emancipation Day celebrations in Greenmarket Square, Cape Town at midnight, 1 December 2016

The Slavery Abolition Act 1833 came into full effect in the Cape Colony on the 1 December 1838, after a four-year period of forced apprenticeship. About 39,000 enslaved people were freed and £1.2 million (roughly equivalent to £4,175,000,000 as a proportion of GDP in 2016 pounds) – of £3 million originally set aside by the British government – was paid out in compensation to 1,300 former slave holding farmers in the colony.

1 December is celebrated as Emancipation Day in South Africa most notably in the city of Cape Town.

=== Trinidad and Tobago ===
It has been said that on 1 August 1985, Trinidad and Tobago, as an independent country, became first former British territory to declare a national holiday to commemorate the abolition of slavery. However, Emancipation Day has been observed as a public holiday in the Bahamas as far back as 1973.

In Trinidad and Tobago, Emancipation Day replaced Columbus Discovery Day, which commemorated the arrival of Christopher Columbus at Moruga on 31 July 1498, as a national public holiday.

The commemoration begins the night before with an all-night vigil and includes religious services, cultural events, street processions past historic landmarks, addresses from dignitaries including an address from the Prime Minister of Trinidad and Tobago and ends with an evening of shows that include a torchlight procession to the national stadium.

== Suriname and the Dutch Caribbean – 1 July ==
On 1 July 1863, slavery was abolished in the colonies of Kingdom of the Netherlands, which included Suriname and the Caribbean islands of Aruba, Curaçao, Sint Maarten, Saba, Sint Eustatius, and Bonaire (known today as the Dutch Caribbean). However, much of the enslaved population had to continue working on the plantations for an additional 10 years in order to mitigate the "loss caused by this measure" to the plantation owners. Today, 1 July is an official holiday in Suriname and Sint Eustatius, but not anywhere else in the Kingdom of the Netherlands.

=== Suriname ===
On 1 July, Keti Koti (Sranantongo: "the chain is cut" or "the chain is broken") is the celebration that marks Emancipation Day in Suriname, a former colony of the Kingdom of the Netherlands. It marks the date when slavery was abolished in Suriname in 1863. The day also remembers that enslaved people in Suriname would not be fully free until 1873, after a mandatory 10-year transition period during which time they were required to work on the plantations for minimal pay and with state sanctioned force. On 1 July 1955, Keti Koti officially became a public holiday in Suriname.

=== Dutch Caribbean ===
The islands of the Dutch Caribbean commemorate emancipation on July 1.

- On Aruba, Curaçao, Sint Maarten, Saba, and Bonaire, Emancipation Day is commemorated on 1 July, but it is not an official public holiday. On Saba, Emancipation Day is a civil servant holiday (i.e., all government offices are closed).
- On Sint Eustatius, Emancipation Day is commemorated on 1 July as an official public holiday. In January 2021, Island Council of St. Eustatius voted to replace Carnival Monday with Emancipation Day a public holiday.

== French West Indies ==
The French West Indies includes eight territories currently under French sovereignty in the Antilles islands of the Caribbean:

- Martinique commemorates emancipation with a national holiday on 22 May, marking the slave resistance on that day in 1848 that forced Governor Claude Rostoland to issue a decree abolishing slavery.
- Guadeloupe commemorates emancipation on 27 May.
- Saint Martin has a week-long celebration around 28 May, commemorating the abolition of slavery.

== Central America ==
=== Nicaragua ===
On Nicaragua's Caribbean Coast, the emancipation of enslaved people occurred in August 1841 but on different dates. Bluefields and Pearl Lagoon received emancipation on 10 August 1841, while Corn Island received emancipation on 27 August 1841.

== United States ==
=== District of Columbia – 16 April ===
The District of Columbia observes 16 April as Emancipation Day. On 16 April 1862, President Abraham Lincoln signed the District of Columbia Compensated Emancipation Act, an act of Compensated emancipation, for the release of certain persons held to service or labor in the District of Columbia. The Act, introduced by Massachusetts senator and ardent abolitionist Henry Wilson, freed about 3,100 slaves in the District of Columbia nine months before President Lincoln issued his broader Emancipation Proclamation. The District of Columbia Compensated Emancipation Act represents the only example of compensation by the federal government to former owners of emancipated slaves.

On 4 January 2005, Mayor Anthony A. Williams signed legislation making Emancipation Day an official public holiday in the District. Although Emancipation Day occurs on 16 April, by law when 16 April falls during a weekend, Emancipation Day is observed on the nearest weekday. This affects the Internal Revenue Service's due date for tax returns, which traditionally must be submitted by 15 April. As the federal government observes the holiday, it causes the federal and all state tax deadlines to be moved to 18 April if Emancipation Day falls on a Saturday or Sunday and to 17 April if Emancipation Day falls on a Monday. Each year, activities are now held during this observed holiday, including the traditional Emancipation Day parade. The parade had taken place yearly from 1866 to 1901. After a 101-year hiatus, DC's parade resumed in 2002, just three years ahead of the new holiday.

=== Florida – 20 May ===
The state of Florida observes emancipation in a ceremonial day on 20 May. In the capital, Tallahassee, Civil War re-enactors playing the part of Major General Edward McCook and other union soldiers act out the speech General McCook gave from the steps of the Knott House on 20 May 1865. This was the first reading of the Emancipation Proclamation in Florida.

=== Georgia – Saturday closest to 29 May ===
Thomaston, Georgia, has been the site of an Emancipation Day celebration since May 1866. Organizers believe it is "the oldest, continuously observed annual emancipation event in the United States." The annual event is scheduled for the Saturday closest to 29 May. William Guilford was an early organizer of the event first held in 1866.

=== Kentucky and Tennessee – 8 August ===
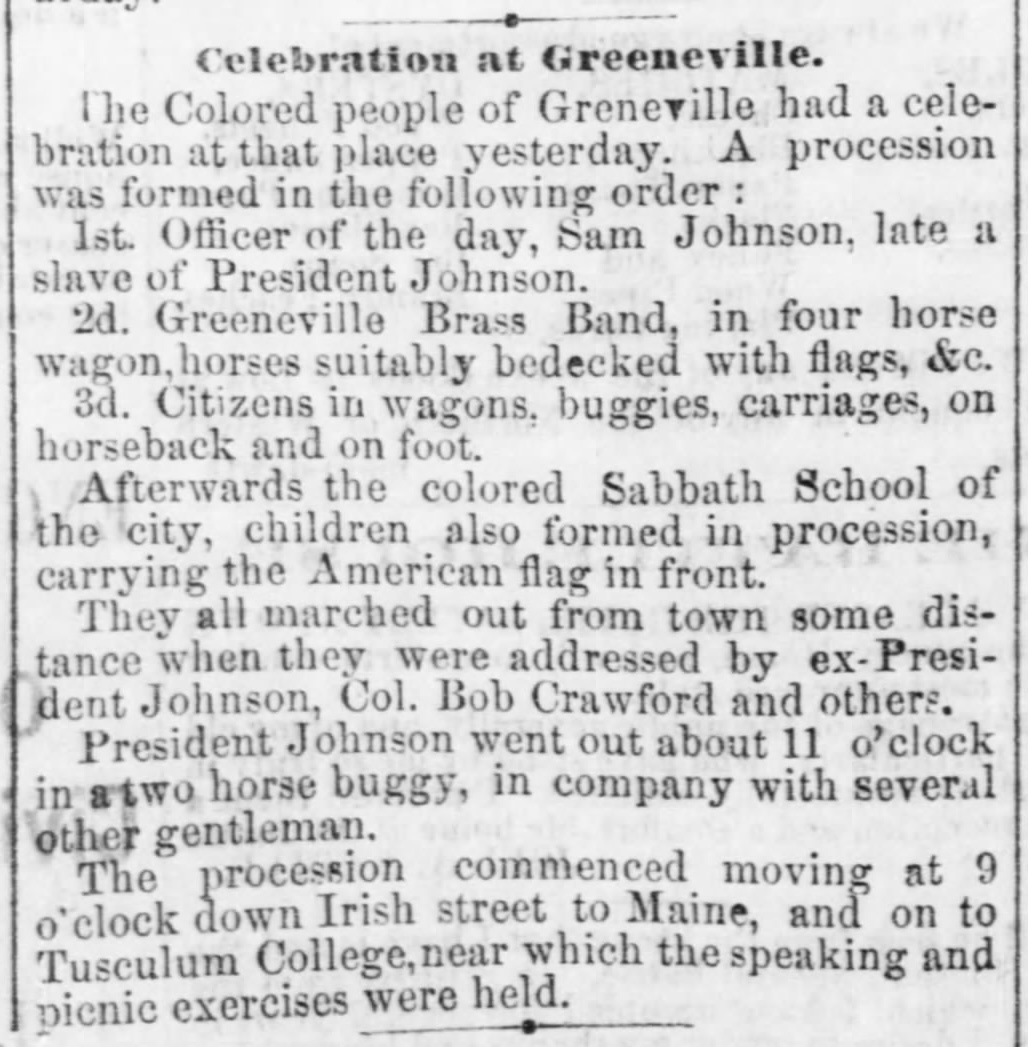
"Celebration at Greeneville," organized by Sam Johnson, "late a slave of Andrew Johnson," article published on page 4 of the Knoxville Daily Chronicle, 9 August 1871

Emancipation Day is celebrated on 8 August in Hopkinsville, Christian County; Paducah, McCracken County; and Russellville, Logan County Kentucky, as well as other communities in western Kentucky and for many years in Southern Illinois in Hardin County. According to the Paducah Sun newspaper, this is the anniversary of the day slaves in this region learned of their freedom in 1865. According to a PBS documentary, it celebrates the liberation of the people enslaved by U.S. President Andrew Johnson, one of whom started the annual celebration in eastern Tennessee.

In 1938, William A. Johnson, who was born enslaved to Andrew Johnson in 1858, spoke at a Tennessee Emancipation Day celebration at Chilhowee Park.

Johnson is one of the last surviving slaves in this section. 1 January was designated as Emancipation day but Andrew Johnson freed his slaves 8 August and Negroes of East Tennessee have always observed that date as Emancipation day. The celebration this year has been changed to 9 August because 8 August is on Sunday.

=== Maryland – 1 November ===
Emancipation Day is celebrated in Maryland on 1 November. Maryland started officially recognizing Emancipation Day in 2013, when then-Governor Martin O'Malley signed a measure to celebrate the freeing of slaves in Maryland on 1 November . Slavery was abolished in Maryland just six months before the end of the Civil War. Maryland's slavery abolishment also was approved two months before the U.S. Constitution's 13th Amendment was passed by Congress, and a full year before the 13th Amendment was ratified.

On 1 November 2020, Maryland Governor Larry Hogan issued a proclamation recognizing Maryland Emancipation Day. "156 years ago, a new state constitution abolished slavery in Maryland. I have issued a proclamation recognizing Maryland Emancipation Day as we reflect on the legacies of the brave Marylanders who risked everything so that they and others might enjoy the promise of freedom."

On 30 October 2020, Montgomery County Executive Marc Elrich and County Council President Sidney Katz, on behalf of the entire Council, presented a joint proclamation Friday proclaiming Sunday, 1 November, as "Emancipation Day" in Montgomery County.

=== Massachusetts – 8 July ===
Massachusetts Emancipation Day, also known as Quock Walker Day, was established by the state legislature in 2022 and first legally observed statewide in 2023. It was observed in the town of Lexington starting in 2020. The observance commemorates the 1783 decision in the freedom suit of Quock Walker, which found slavery to be an unenforceable legal arrangement under the 1780 Massachusetts Constitution. Massachusetts became the first state to record zero slaves in the federal census of 1790, as slavery was abandoned in favor of indentured servitude or paid employment.

=== Mississippi – 8 May ===
In Columbus, Mississippi, Emancipation Day is celebrated on 8 May, known locally as "Eight o' May". As in other southern states, the local celebration commemorates the date in 1865 when African Americans in eastern Mississippi learned of their freedom.

Though the 13th amendment was ratified by the necessary three-quarters vote, Mississippi withheld its ratification document after the constitutional amendment was submitted to the states. Mississippi finally submitted the ratification document on 7 February 2013.

=== South Carolina – 1 January ===
In South Carolina, Emancipation Day is celebrated on 1 January. There are two reasons for the date. First, 1 January 1808, marked an official end to United States participation in the Atlantic slave trade. Additionally, on 1 January 1863, Colonel Thomas Wentworth Higginson read the Emancipation Proclamation, which went into effect on that day, to the members of the 1st South Carolina Volunteer Infantry Regiment (Colored), which at the time was stationed in coastal South Carolina.

=== Texas – 19 June "Juneteenth" ===
In Texas, Emancipation Day is celebrated on 19 June. It commemorates Major General Gordon Granger's announcement of General Order No. 3 in Galveston, Texas, on 19 June 1865, informing enslaved people in Texas that they were free. The day is commonly known as Juneteenth. Since the late twentieth century, Juneteenth has gained recognition throughout the United States and became a federal holiday in 2021.

Juneteenth celebrations commonly include public readings of General Order No. 3 or the Emancipation Proclamation, musical performances, parades, festivals, family reunions, picnics and barbecues, rodeos, educational events, and pageants such as Miss Juneteenth.

=== Virginia – 3 April ===
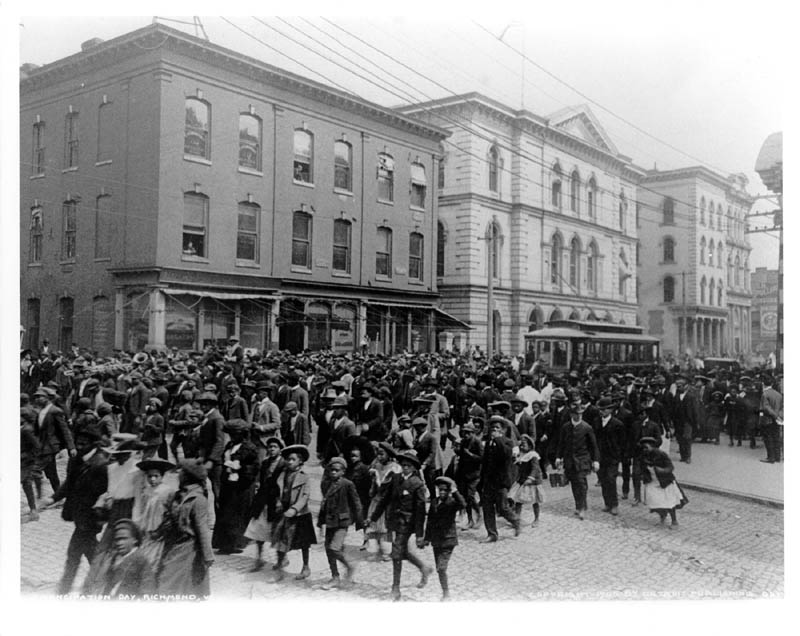
Emancipation Day, April 3, in Richmond, Virginia, 1905

In Richmond, Virginia, 3 April is commemorated as Emancipation Day. 3 April marks the day, in 1865, that Richmond fell to the Union Army, who were led by the United States Colored Troops.

=== Territories ===
==== Puerto Rico – 22 March ====
Puerto Rico celebrates Emancipation Day (Día de la Abolición de Esclavitud), an official holiday, on 22 March. Slavery was abolished in Puerto Rico in 1873 while the island was still a colony of Spain.

==== U.S. Virgin Islands – 3 July ====
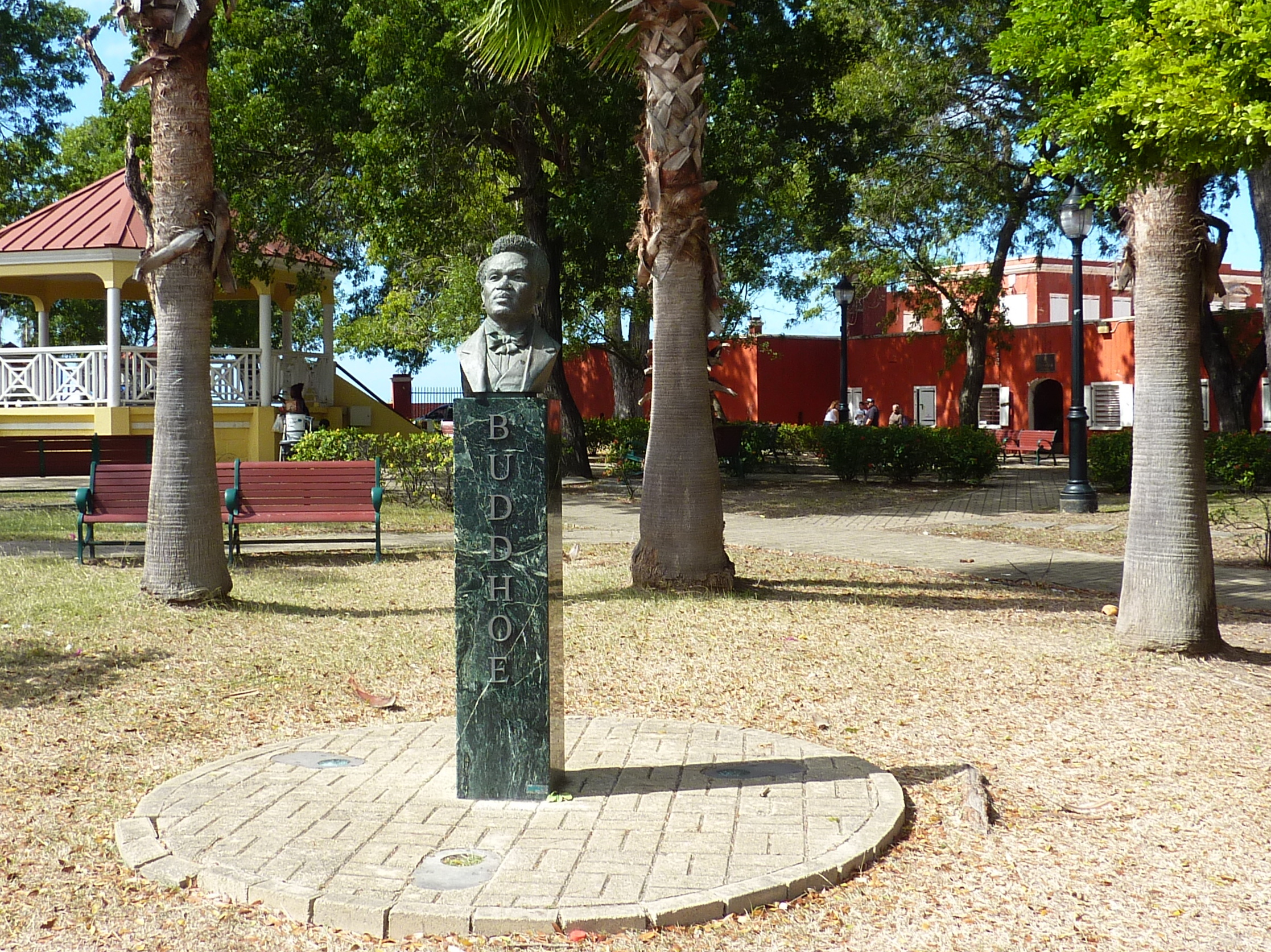
Statue of Buddhoe at Fort Frederik, St. Croix

The United States Virgin Islands celebrates V.I. Emancipation Day as an official holiday on 3 July. It commemorates the Danish Governor Peter von Scholten's 1848 proclamation that "all unfree in the Danish West Indies are from today emancipated," following a slave rebellion led by John Gottlieb (Moses Gottlieb, General Buddhoe) in Frederiksted, Saint Croix.

In addition to recognising Emancipation Day, since 2017 the full week leading up to 3 July has been recognised as Virgin Islands Freedom Week. Emancipation Day, Freedom Week, and the culmination of St. John Festival are celebrated throughout the U.S. Virgin Islands with concerts, dancing, workshops, a historical skit, and a reenactment of the walk to Fort Frederik.

== See also ==
- Abolitionism
- Fifth of July (New York)
- Kwanzaa
- Slave Trade Acts
- Thirteenth Amendment to the United States Constitution
