= United Nations Declaration of the Trafficking of Enslaved Africans and Racialized Chattel Enslavement of Africans as the Gravest Crime against Humanity =

Declaration adopted in 2026 by the United Nations General Assembly

UN General Assembly Resolution A/RES/80/250
- Date: 25 March 2026
- Meeting no.: 75th meeting (Eightieth Session, AM)
- Code: A/RES/80/250 (Document)
- Subject: Human rights
- Voting summary: 123 voted for; 3 voted against; 52 abstained; 15 absent
- Result: Adopted

The United Nations Declaration of the Trafficking of Enslaved Africans and Racialized Chattel Enslavement of Africans as the Gravest Crime against Humanity (UNDOTEA) is a legally non-binding United Nations resolution passed by the General Assembly on 25 March 2026 as part of the agenda item "Commemoration of the abolition of slavery and the transatlantic slave trade."

== Background ==
The vote took place on 25 March, the annual International Day of Remembrance of the Victims of Slavery and the Transatlantic Slave Trade, established by United Nations General Assembly resolution in 2007 to commemorate the anniversary of the abolition of the transatlantic slave trade by the United Kingdom on 25 March 1807.

The draft text "L.48" was proposed by the African Union and was co-sponsored by 54 African States Algeria, Angola, Benin, Botswana, Burkina Faso, Burundi, Cabo Verde, Cameroon, Central African Republic, Chad, Comoros, Congo, Côte d'Ivoire, Democratic Republic of the Congo, Djibouti, Egypt, Equatorial Guinea, Eritrea, Eswatini, Ethiopia, Gabon, Gambia, Ghana, Guinea, Guinea-Bissau, Kenya, Lesotho, Liberia, Libya, Madagascar, Malawi, Mali, Mauritania, Mauritius, Morocco, Mozambique, Namibia, Niger, Nigeria, Rwanda, São Tomé and Príncipe, Senegal, Seychelles, Sierra Leone, Somalia, South Africa, South Sudan, Sudan, Togo, Tunisia, Uganda, United Republic of Tanzania, Zambia, Zimbabwe and 4 non-African States (Barbados, Belarus, Saint Kitts and Nevis, Venezuela).

The text was defended by Ghana's foreign minister, Samuel Okudzeto Ablakwa on behalf of the African Group, who emphasised that the declaration "does not create legal hierarchies of crime" but aims to "complete history by establishing a principled framework for reconciliation grounded in truth and rooted 'not in retribution, but in moral recognition.'"

== Vote and reactions ==
The resolution was adopted with 123 votes in favour, 3 against (Argentina, Israel, United States), 52 abstentions and 15 non-voting.

The United States voted against, with its representative calling the resolution "highly problematic in countless respects" and rejecting what it described as the "cynical usage of historical wrongs" to reallocate resources, as well as refusing to recognize a legal right to reparations for acts not prohibited under international law at the time of their occurrence.

The United Kingdom as well as States of the European Union abstained, expressing concern that the resolution's use of superlatives implied a legally unsupported hierarchy among crimes against humanity, objected to what they described as selective and contentious historical references inconsistent with established United Nations General Assembly (UNGA) practice, and argued that the text's references to reparations for slavery and retroactive application of international rules were incompatible with the principle of non-retroactivity under international law.

The Caribbean Community (CARICOM) strongly supported the resolution, calling on the international community to move "from remembrance to action" and endorsing reparatory justice frameworks as essential to addressing the enduring legacies of slavery.

== See also ==
=== Internal links ===
- Human rights
- United Nations Human Rights Council
- Slavery
  - Slavery in Africa
  - Atlantic slave trade
  - Slavery in the United States
- African diaspora
- International Decade for People of African Descent
- United Nations Permanent Forum on People of African Descent
