= Justin Hansford =

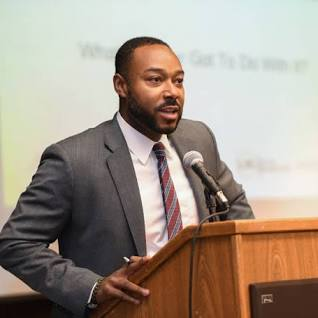
- Hansford in 2019.
- Born: 1981 (age 44–45); Washington D.C., U.S.
- Education: Howard University; Georgetown University Law Center
- Occupation: Professor of Law
- Employer: Howard University School of Law
- Known for: Professor of Law, Civil Rights Advocate
- Awards: Fulbright Scholar award

Justin Hansford (born 1981) is a Professor of Law at Howard University School of Law and the founder and executive director of the Thurgood Marshall Civil Rights Center. He was nominated by the United States to serve as a founding member of the United Nations Permanent Forum on People of African Descent (PFPAD) and was elected by the U.N. General Assembly. Hansford was previously a democracy project fellow at Harvard University, a visiting professor of law at Georgetown University Law Center, and an associate professor of law at the Saint Louis University School of Law.

== Education and career ==
Hansford received his B.A. from Howard University and his J.D. from Georgetown University Law Center. While a law student at Georgetown, he founded The Georgetown Journal of Law and Modern Critical Race Perspectives. He was awarded a Fulbright Scholar award to study the legal career of Nelson Mandela, and served as a clerk for Judge Damon J. Keith on the United States Court of Appeals for the Sixth Circuit.

Hansford is a scholar and activist, specializing in critical race theory, human rights, and law and social movements. He is a co-author of the Seventh Edition of Race, Racism and American Law. He is also a member of the Stanford Medicine Commission on Justice and Equity. He serves as the lawyer for Marcus Garvey's son the effort to posthumously exonerate Marcus Garvey for mail fraud.

== Activism ==
Living in St. Louis at the time, Hansford immediately became involved in the legal efforts and political protests following the death of Michael Brown in 2015. One of his most prominent efforts was to write a human rights shadow report for a group he helped create, Ferguson to Geneva. He then traveled to Switzerland to present the report along with the family of Michael Brown and other advocates and protesters from Ferguson. Hansford's "rebellious," hands-on advocacy in the justice movement has been written about by Howard law professor Harold McDougall in his article, "The Rebellious Law Professor: Combining Cause and Reflective Lawyering".

During this period, Hansford was arrested while serving as a legal observer in a protest near Ferguson, causing debate in legal academia regarding the propriety of faculty political activism. Following his arrest, much of Hansford’s work focused on issues surrounding police brutality and free speech. His work on police brutality and the Black Lives Matter movement has been featured on Democracy Now, PBS, and CNN. He contributed to advocacy for protester treatment, including co-authoring a United States Supreme Court amicus brief in Doe v. McKesson and writing for Yale Law Journal and the New York Times. Hansford has also been vocal about the consequences of his repeated exposure to tear gas and trauma from police aggression during protests.

== Thurgood Marshall Civil Rights Center ==
In 2018, Professor Hansford founded Thurgood Marshall Civil Rights Center at Howard University School of Law. The center was designed to serve as Howard University's flagship institutional setting for the study and practice of civil rights, human rights, and racial justice law and advocacy.

In 2018, along with Howard University law students, Hansford began working to help draft the Movement for Black Lives Reparations toolkit, designed to support grassroots reparations campaigns. In 2019, Hansford founded the first Movement Lawyering law clinic in the nation at Howard University School of Law. Through the clinic and the center, Hansford immediately became active, serving as a movement lawyer for the reparations movement. In the same year, the center successfully requested a hearing before the Inter-American Commission on Human Rights on reparations enslavement and Hansford continued to articulate the legal theory for reparations using international law.

In 2020, the center partnered with Columbia University’s School for International and Public Affairs to establish the African American Redress Network. In 2021, the center hosted a national convening on reparations and provided legal support to Evanston, Illinois, for its pioneering housing-based reparations ordinance, the first in the nation.

In 2023, Hansford delivered a speech on reparations at the United Nations advocating that “reparations is what justice looks like in the 21st century".

In 2024, Hansford appeared in the documentary “The Cost of Inheritance,” which aired nationally on PBS.

== Justice for Marcus Garvey ==
Hansford is part of the leadership team for Justice for Garvey, an effort to posthumously pardon famed civil rights leader Marcus Garvey and exonerate him from his 1923 prosecution to mail fraud which has been argued to have been politically and racially motivated by J. Edgar Hoover and others. He co-authored a piece for The Root on the project: "Black History Matters: Why President Obama Should Pardon Marcus Garvey."

In 2025, the campaign successfully resulted in President Joe Biden granting Garvey a posthumous pardon.

== Awards ==
- Top Lawyers in Racial Justice, National Jurist Magazine, 2020.
- D.C. Rising Star Award from the National Law Journal, 2022.

== Bibliography ==
- Hansford, Justin. Jailing a Rainbow: The Unjust Trial and Conviction of Marcus Garvey. Baltimore: Black Classic Press, (2024). ISBN 1574782312.
- Hansford, Justin, Derrick A. Bell, Cheryl I. Harris, Amna A. Akbar. Race, Racism, and American Law: Leading Cases and Materials. Aspen Publishing, (2023). ISBN 1543850294.
