= Emancipation Park (Kingston, Jamaica) =

Park in New Kingston, Jamaica

Coordinates: 18°00′09″N 76°47′24″W

Emancipation Park is a public park in Kingston, Jamaica.

The park is in New Kingston, opened on 31 July 2002, the day before Emancipation Day. Prime Minister P.J. Patterson's address at the park's opening acknowledged that the park is a commemoration of the end of slavery in the British Empire and French Caribbean.

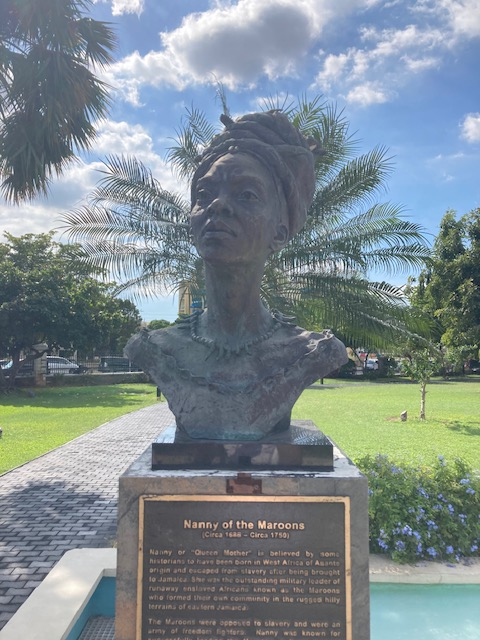
A bust of Nanny of the Maroons

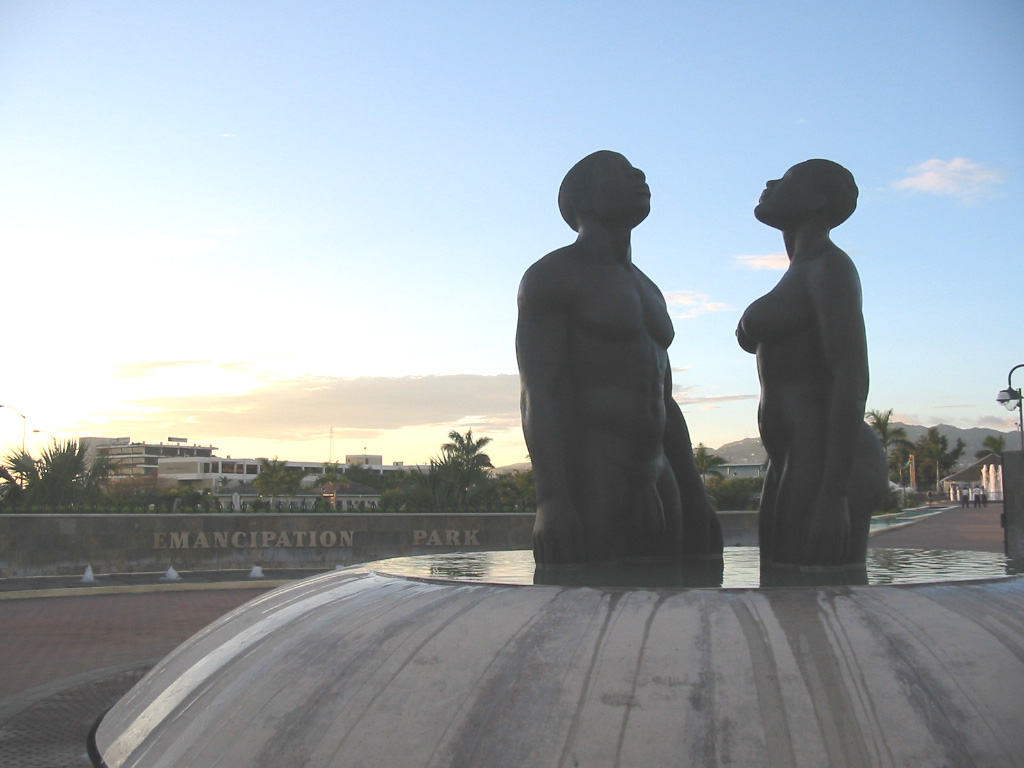
Redemption Song by Laura Facey, 2003

The six-acre park includes fountains and public art. The park is known for the large sculpture Redemption Song at the park's main entrance. Redemption Song, which takes its name from Bob Marley's song of the same name, is an 11 ft. (approximately 3m) high bronze sculpture by Jamaican artist Laura Facey. The sculpture features a male and female figure gazing to the skies – symbolic of their triumphant rise from the horrors of slavery. The statue was unveiled in July 2003, in time for the park's first anniversary.

The Adinkra symbols can be seen at many places in the park as a tribute to honour the ancestors of Jamaicans who were brought as slaves from West Africa. The architect Kamau Kambui has used these symbols in the perimeter fence, the walls at the entrance, the benches and garbage receptacles.

== See also ==
- Parque de la Abolición
