= International Day for the Abolition of Slavery =

Annual UN event

The International Day for the Abolition of Slavery is a yearly event on December 2, organized since 1986 by the United Nations General Assembly.

The Convention for the Suppression of the Traffic in Persons and of the Exploitation of the Prostitution of Others was approved by the United Nations General Assembly on December 2, 1949. Besides, by resolution 57/195 of 18 December 2002, the Assembly proclaimed 2004 the International Year to Commemorate the Struggle against Slavery and its Abolition.

== See also ==
- Anti-Slavery Day Act 2010, a UK Act to commemorate the day each year in October
- International Day for the Remembrance of the Slave Trade and its Abolition
