= Park Avenue Historic District (Tallahassee, Florida) =

Historic district in Florida, United States

- U.S. National Register of Historic Places
- U.S. Historic district
- Location within Florida Location within the United States
- Location: Tallahassee, Florida
- Coordinates: 30°26′34.116″N 84°16′57.9108″W
- Area: 590 acres (2.4 km^{2})
- NRHP reference No.: 79000681
- Added to NRHP: October 24, 1979

The Park Avenue Historic District is a U.S. historic district (designated as such on October 24, 1979) located in Tallahassee, Florida. The district runs along Park Avenue and Call Street. It contains 27 historic buildings.

== History ==
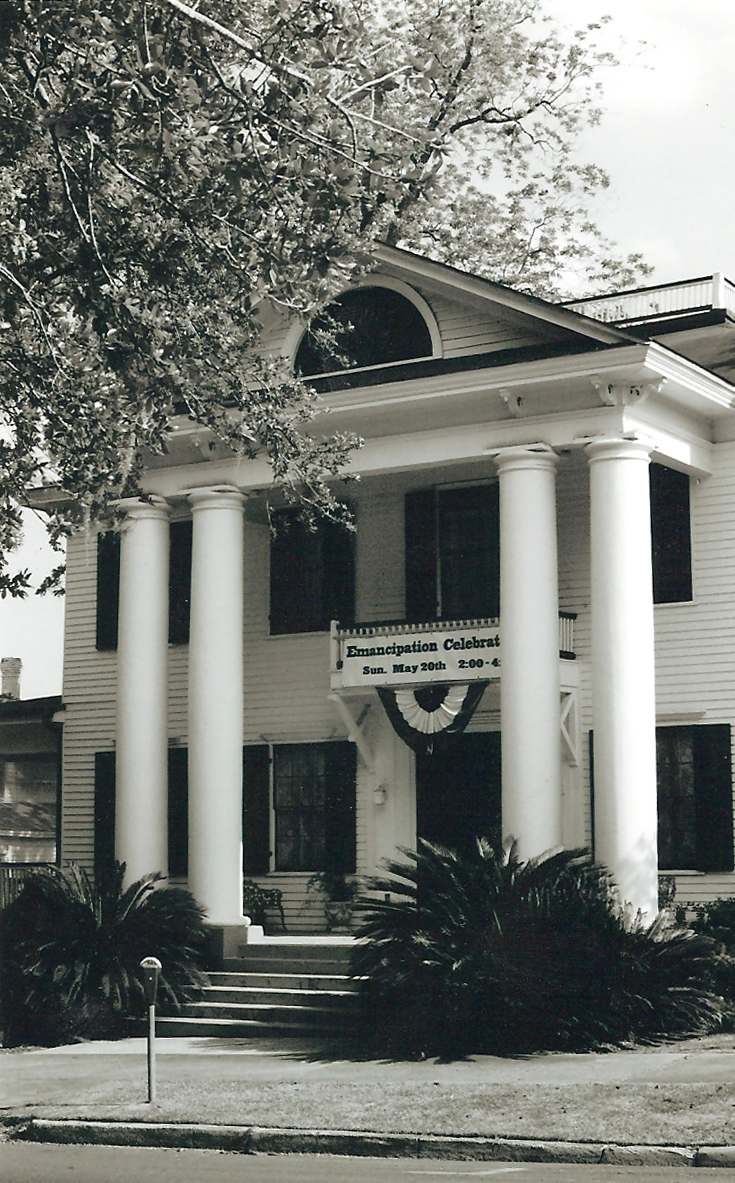
The Knott House, a prominent building on Park Avenue. The banner is advertising the 2007 Florida Emancipation Day celebration.

Park avenue once marked the northern boundary of Tallahassee. Outside of this boundary ran a 200 ft (61 m) dirt clearing designed to protect the city from Indian attacks. During the 19th century, the district was valued as a premier location in the city. Residences, businesses, government buildings, and churches were built along the street. The dirt clearings that had previously served as a barrier were converted into parks beginning in the 1880s. They were named in the late 1930s.

=== Notable buildings ===
The oldest home in the district is The Columns, built by William "Money" Williams in 1830. Today it serves as the headquarters of the James Madison Institute. The Murphy House, c. 1838, now houses antique stores. The William V. Knott House, c. 1843, houses an admission free house museum. Both houses may have been built by a free Black contractor named George Proctor. The Knott House was temporarily used as the headquarters of the Union Army during the American Civil War. The Emancipation Proclamation was read from its steps on May 20, 1865 declaring freedom for all slaves in the Florida Panhandle. Other notable buildings include First Presbyterian Church, the oldest remaining church building in Tallahassee, the David S. Walker Library, and the LeMoyne Art Foundation.

=== Old City Cemetery ===
The Old City Cemetery sits at the western end of the district at the corner of Park Avenue and Martin Luther King Boulevard. It is the oldest public burying ground in Tallahassee. The cemetery was racially segregated until 1937 when African Americans were completely barred from the cemetery. A special section was also set aside for the Jewish community due to a religious requirement for specially consecrated ground.

One large notable grave marker belongs to Mrs Elizabeth (Bessie) Budd Graham (died 1889) also called "The Witch's Grave". The gray French granite obelisk is estimated to weigh more than fifteen tons in an elaborate Victorian design. The grave marker has a number of unusual characteristics including facing West and cryptic epitaph made up of lines from Edgar Allan Poe's poem Lenore. Despite rumors of witchcraft there is "nothing whatsoever has come to light to warrant insinuations about her having been a witch—no document or even folklore from her time. There is nothing but nonsense, and most of that is apparent fakelore and social-media talklore"

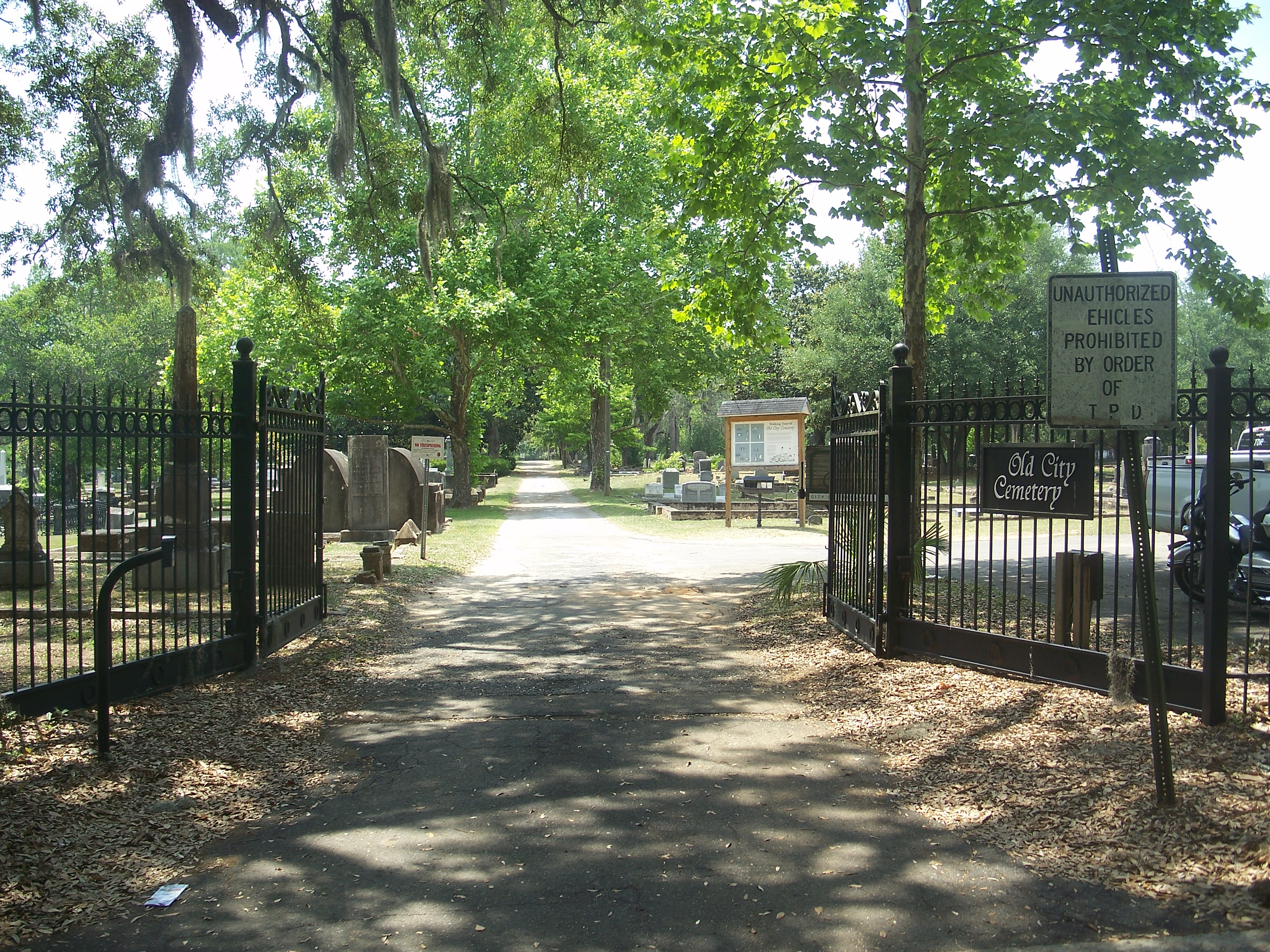
Entry to Old City Cemetery

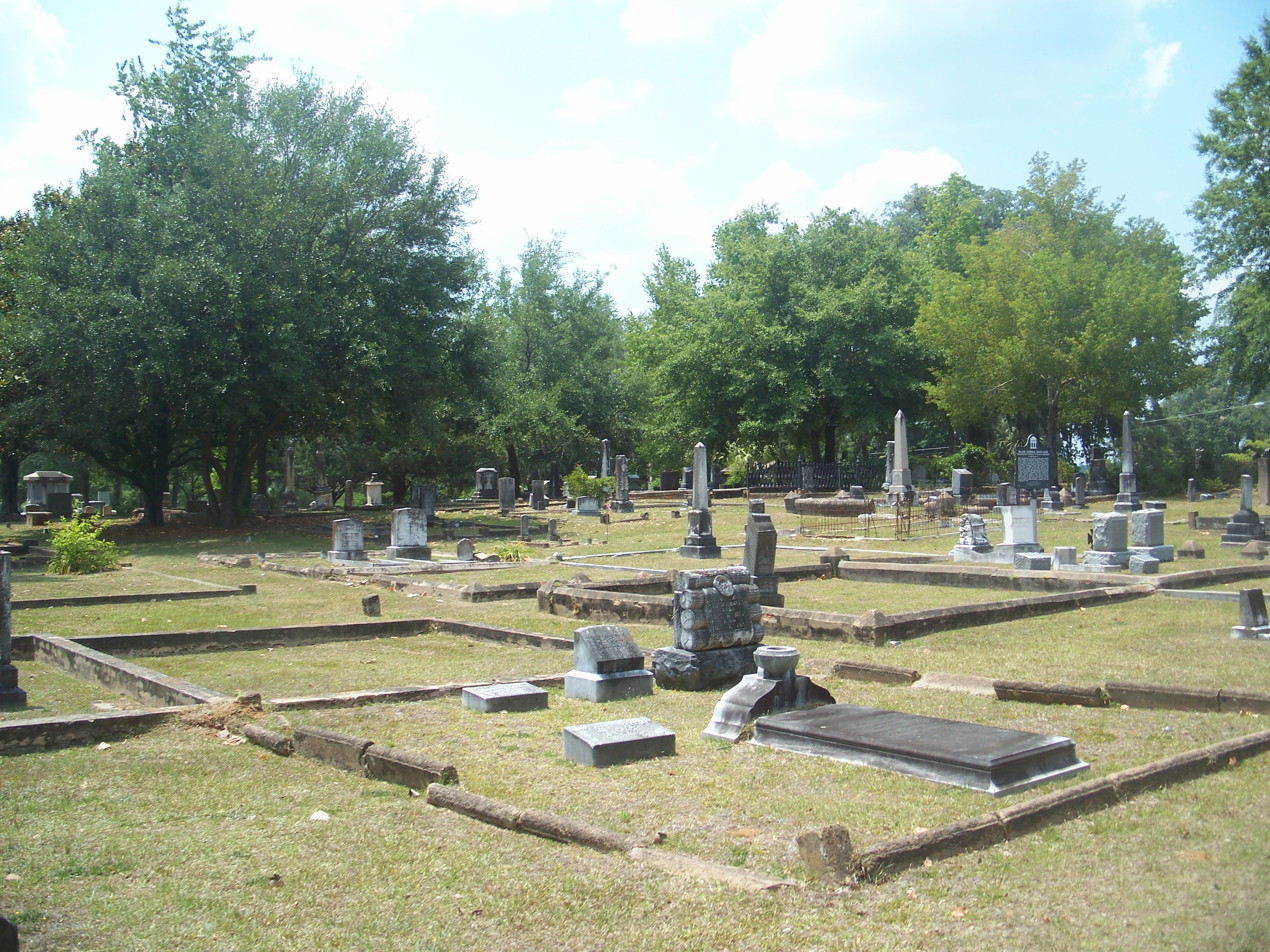
The Grounds of the cemetery

Old markers in the City Cemetery
