= International Year for People of African Descent =

2011 UN theme year

The United Nations General Assembly declared the year 2011 as International Year for People of African Descent (in UN resolution A/RES/64/169). That year also marked the 10th anniversary of the World Conference Against Racism (also known as the Durban Conference), which approved a resolution stating that slavery along with the colonization that sustained it were crimes against humanity.

== Selected related initiatives ==
The United Nations High Commission for Human Rights coordinated activities surrounding the Year, and encouraged other parties, both UN agencies as well as member states, to carry out similar initiatives. These included:

- February: Islands as Crossroads: Sustaining Cultural Diversity in Small Island Developing States (publication)
- February 4–24: Exhibition on Arts and Poetry by artist Hilda Zagaglia, Alta Garcia, Argentina
- February 28–March 3: Meeting of the International Scientific Committee of the UNESCO Slave Route Project, Bogotá
- March 21–23: SEPHIS Workshop "Equity, Justice, Development: People of African Descent in Latin America in comparative Perspective", University of Cartagena, Colombia
- April: Launching of the international Year for People of African Descent in Brazil, UNESCO Brasília
- May 4–11: Black International Cinema Festival, Fountainhead Tanz Theatre, Berlin, Germany
- May 10: Commemorating the Slave Trade and Slavery as a Crime against Humanity, France
- June 6–12: Afro-Brazilian Arts and Cultural Heritage Festival, Washington, D.C., United States
- July 4–15: Harriet Tubman Student Summer Programme on "Introduction to African and African Diaspora Studies", York University, Toronto, Canada
- August 11–13: Pan-African Women's Action Summit, Minneapolis Community and Technical College, Minneapolis, Minnesota, US
- August 23: International Day for the Remembrance of the Slave Trade and its Abolition
  - Angola: Conference "Escravos angolanos povoaram tambem as Antilhas Neerlandesas" ("Angolan slaves also populated the Netherlands Antilles"), organized by the Eduardo dos Santos Foundation, at the Agostinho Neto University in Luanda
  - Democratic Republic of Congo (DRC): Workshop on achievements of the Slave Route Project in the DRC, with presentation of The Slave Trade, Slavery and Colonial Violence in the Democratic Republic of Congo (published 2010)
  - Ghana: Workshop on the slave trade for educators from three regions of the world, Accra
  - Grenada: exhibition and commemorative activities organized by National Commission for UNESCO and the National Museum of Grenada, St. George's
  - Madagascar: screening of the documentary Slave Routes: A Global Vision, at the University of Antananarivo
  - Saint Kitts and Nevis: launch of the activities of the national committee for the Slave Route Project
  - Senegal: Panel discussion, painting and photo exhibition, cultural and artistic activities at the Joseph Ndiaye Socio-cultural Centre, Gorée
  - United Kingdom: Commemoration at the National Maritime Museum, London
- September 22–24: 7th International African Diaspora Heritage Trail Conference, World Trade and Convention Centre, Halifax, Nova Scotia, Canada
- October: Boscoe Holder exhibition at the Upper Room Art Gallery at Top of the Mount, Mount Saint Benedict, St Augustine, Trinidad
- October 20: Panel discussion "The Causes and Consequences of Racism", Eastern Michigan University, Ypsilanti, Michigan, US
- October 29: Celebration of the International Year for People of African Descent and Promotion of the General History of Africa, UNESCO, Paris
- November 2 (–June 24, 2012): Itinerant photographic exhibition: Women in Africa - No Color One Color, Italian Institute of Culture, Nairobi, Kenya; Sheraton Hotel, Milan Malpensa Airport, Italy; and other venues
- November 9: Celebration – International Year for People of African Descent; Africa, Mère de tous les peuples. Palais des Nations, Geneva, Switzerland. On the occasion of the International Year for People of African Descent.
- Brazil-Africa: Crossed Histories Programme in the 36th UNESCO General Conference

== See also ==
- International Decade for People of African Descent (2015–2024)
