= June Soomer =

Saint Lucian diplomat

- Born: Saint Lucia
- Alma mater: University of the West Indies at Cave Hill
- Occupation: Diplomat

June Soomer is a Saint Lucian diplomat. She served as the first woman Secretary General of the Association of Caribbean States, from 2016 to 2020.

June Soomer was born in Saint Lucia. She was educated at St. Joseph's Convent. She earned a PhD in history from the University of the West Indies at Cave Hill in 1994, the first woman to earn a history doctorate there. Her dissertation was about the government of the West Indies from 1958 to 1962.

Soomer was first woman to serve as ambassador from Saint Lucia to the Caribbean Community and the Organisation of Eastern Caribbean States. She is a member of the United Nations Permanent Forum on People of African Descent.

She has been awarded the Order “José de Marcoleta” in the Degree of Grand Cross by the government of Nicaragua and the Saint Lucia Cross.
