= International Day for the Remembrance of the Slave Trade and its Abolition =

International observance

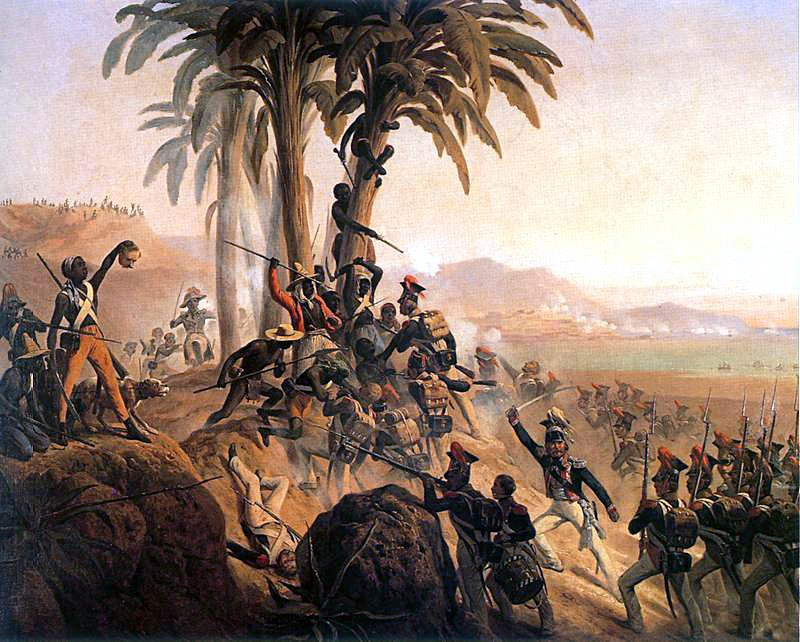
Slave uprising in Haiti - Battle for Santo Domingo, by January Suchodolski, 1845)

The International Day for the Remembrance of the Slave Trade and its Abolition (French: Journée internationale du souvenir de la traite négrière et de son abolition) is an international day celebrated 23 August of each year, the day designated by UNESCO to memorialize the transatlantic slave trade.

That date was chosen by the adoption of resolution 29 C/40 by the Organization's General Conference at its 29th session. Circular CL/3494 of 29 July 1998, from the Director-General invited Ministers of Culture to promote the day. The date is significant because, during the night of 22 August to 23 August 1791, on the island of Saint Domingue (now known as Haiti), an uprising began which set forth events which were a major factor in the abolition of the transatlantic slave trade.

UNESCO Member States organize events every year on that date, inviting participation from young people, educators, artists and intellectuals. As part of the goals of the intercultural UNESCO project, "The Slave Route", it is an opportunity for collective recognition and focus on the "historic causes, the methods and the consequences" of slavery. Additionally, it sets the stage for analysis and dialogue of the interactions which gave rise to the transatlantic trade in human beings between Africa, Europe, the Americas and the Caribbean.

== Activity within different nations ==
The International Day for the Remembrance of the Slave Trade and its Abolition was first celebrated in a number of countries, in particular in Haiti on 23 August 1998, and Senegal on 23 August 1999. A number of cultural events and debates were organized.

=== France ===
In 2001 the Museum of Printed Textiles (Musée de l'impression sur étoffes) in Mulhouse, France, conducted a fabric workshop entitled "Indiennes de Traite" (a type of calico) used as currency in trade for Africans.

=== United Kingdom ===
==== Liverpool ====
National Museums Liverpool and the black community in Liverpool have held events to commemorate Slavery Remembrance Day since 1999. The Liverpool Slavery Remembrance Initiative – a partnership between National Museums Liverpool, individuals from the Liverpool Black community, Liverpool City Council, Liverpool Culture Company and The Mersey Partnership – was founded in 2006 to lead on the organisation of the event. The International Slavery Museum in Liverpool opened its doors on 23 August 2007. The Walk of Remembrance through the city began in 2011, which has been led by Dr Gee Walker since 2013. The route passes the site of Old Dock where slave ships were moored and been repaired, and finishes at the Dr Martin Luther King Jr Building where it is closed by a Libation ceremony at Albert Dock.

==== London ====
The inaugural Slavery Remembrance National Memorial Service will be held on 21 August 2016 in Trafalgar Square. The National Maritime Museum in Greenwich hosts an annual commemoration event on 23 August which closes with a silent ceremony on the banks of the river Thames.

== Other international observances ==
Other comparable international observances include:

- International Day of Commemoration in Memory of the Victims of the Holocaust - 27 January
- International Day for the Elimination of Racial Discrimination - 21 March
- International Day of Remembrance of the Victims of Slavery and the Transatlantic Slave Trade - 25 March
- International Day for Tolerance - 16 November
- International Day for the Abolition of Slavery - 2 December

and:

- the International Year to Commemorate the Struggle against Slavery and its Abolition in 2004
- the International Year for People of African Descent in 2011
- the International Decade for People of African Descent 2015–2024
