= Rodney Leon =

American architect

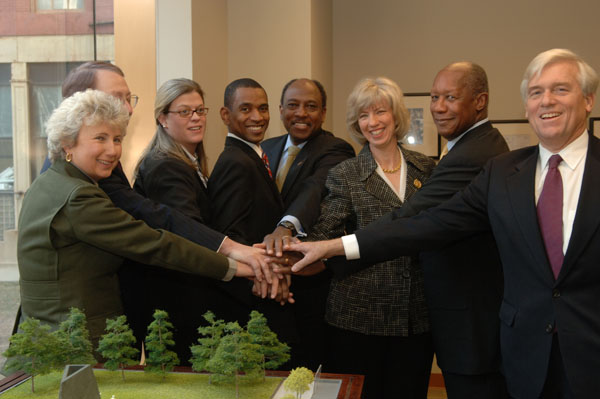
- Leon (fourth from left) at a Department of the Interior event in 2006
- Education: Pratt Institute School of Architecture; Yale University
- Occupation: Architect
- Website: http://www.rodneyleon.com/home

Rodney Leon is an American architect. He is the founder of Rodney Leon Architect. He is the designer of the monument The Ark of Return, and the memorial for the New York City African Burial Ground National Monument. He specializes in urban planning projects in the United States of America, and abroad, projects with cultural, residential, and religious. He is a member of The Haitian Roundtable (HRT). It is an organization of the Haitian-American professionals committed to civic engagement as well as philanthropic endeavors to benefit Haiti. It was started in 2008.

== Early life ==
Leon was born and raised in Brooklyn, New York. His parents were immigrants from Haiti.

== Career ==
In 1992, Leon received a Bachelor of Architecture degree from Pratt Institute School of Architecture in New York City. In 1995, he received a Master of Architecture from Yale University. From 1998 to 2003, he was visiting design professor at Pratt Institute School of Architecture in New York City. In 2003 he was 2nd year design coordinator for Pratt in 2003. He is as an adjunct professor of advanced design since 2009. Since 2014 Leon is a capital and planning grants reviewer for the New York State Council of the Arts.

In 1998, Leon submitted a proposal to design the African Burial Ground National Monument in New York City. He was one of the five designers selected from 61 applicants. In 2005, he was designated the official designer for the monument. Rodney Leon was designer, and co-founder along with Nicole Hollant-Denis of the AARRIS Architects were chosen to build the $3 million permanent memorial. The memorial was built on the colonial-era burial ground of enslaved Africans in lower Manhattan, in New York City. The grave site was found in 1991.

Leon is the designer of The Ark of Return, a permanent memorial to victims of the Atlantic slave trade. His design was chosen by UNESCO as part of an international competition. It is installed at the United Nations Plaza in New York City, where it was unveiled on March 25, 2015 as part of the United Nations' International Decade for People of African Descent and to commemorate the International Day of Remembrance of the Victims of Slavery and the Transatlantic Slave Trade. Secretary-General of the United Nations Ban Ki-moon, Sam Kutesa the President of the United Nations General Assembly, and Prime Minister Portia Simpson Miller of Jamaica were the ribbon cutters during the unveiling ceremony.

Leon is a member of American Institute of Architects (AIA), and National Organization of Minority Architects (NOMA). Leon and Nicole Hollant-Denis are the principal architects for Belle Rive Residential Resort in Jacmel, Haiti. It is a private resort style residential development with 94 townhouses, tower apartments, and a 120-room four start hotel and private club.

== Architectural projects ==
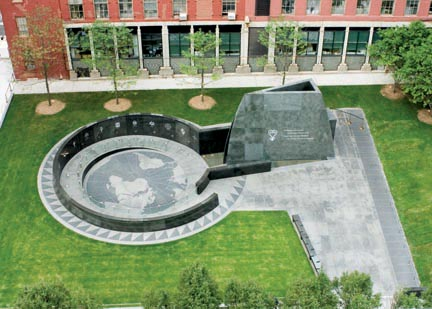
African Burial Ground (NYC) aerial view

=== Cultural designs ===
- The Ark of Return
- African Burial Ground Memorial
- Museum of Contemporary African Diaspora Arts
- National Hip Hop Museum Master Plan
- Salvation Army Community Center in the Bushwick neighborhood of Brooklyn

=== Residential ===
- Belle Rive Residential Resort Master Plan
- River Front View
- Le Coeur Vert
- Haiti Softhouse
- Cycle of Life Housing

=== Religious ===
- Islamic Cultural Center
- French Evangelical Church
- Convent Avenue Baptist Church

Leon is a member of American Institute of Architects (AIA), and National Organization of Minority Architects (NOMA). Leon and Nicole Hollant-Denis are the principal architects for Belle Rive Residential Resort in Jacmel, Haiti. It is a private resort style residential development with 94 townhouses, tower apartments, and a 120-room four start hotel and private club.
