= International Decade for People of African Descent =

World decade 2015–2024 and 2025-2035

- Duration: 2014-2024 and 2025-2035
- Location: Globally
- Also known as: IDPAD
- Theme: “People of African descent: recognition, justice and development”
- Website: www.un.org/en/observances/decade-people-african-descent

The International Decade for People of African Descent, 2015–2024, was proclaimed by the UN General Assembly in a Resolution (68/237) adopted on 23 December 2013. The theme of the International Decade was "People of African descent: recognition, justice and development".

On 17 December 2024, a United Nations declaration proclaimed the Second International Decade for People of African Descent, beginning on 1 January 2025, stating that it would be "an opportunity to take concrete actions to confront the legacies of enslavement and colonialism, deliver reparatory justice, and secure the full human rights and freedoms of people of African descent worldwide."

== Stated objectives ==
The stated objectives of the International Decade for People of African Descent were to:

- Promote respect, protection and fulfilment of all human rights and fundamental freedoms by people of African Descent, as recognized in the Universal Declaration of Human Rights;
- Promote a greater knowledge of and respect for the diverse heritage, culture and contribution of people of African descent to the development of societies;
- Adopt and strengthen national, regional and international legal frameworks according to the Durban Declaration and Programme of Action and the International Convention on the Elimination of All Forms of Racial Discrimination and to ensure their full and effective implementation.

== The Second International Decade for People of African Descent ==
Following a UN declaration of 17 December 2024, proclaiming a Second International Decade for People of African Descent, beginning on 1 January 2025, the Chair of CARICOM, Mia Mottley, Prime Minister of Barbados, stated: "The achievement reflects the tireless advocacy of our Region and the strides made during the first decade, including global recognition of our ten-point plan for reparatory justice and the establishment of the United Nations Permanent Forum for People of African Descent. ... We must continue to press the international community for a mature, face-to-face conversation at all levels, so that we may see them repair the damage from the exploitation through the immoral institutions of slavery and colonialism which our people suffered from." Prof. Sir Hilary Beckles, CARICOM Reparations Commission (CRC) Chair, said: "I welcome the observance by the United Nations of a Second International Decade for People of African Descent for continued focused attention to the advancement of African people. This is a great outcome resulting from the concerted activism of civil society and Governments in the Americas and in Africa."

== Background ==
The seeds of the International Decade for People of African Descent were sown in 2001 with the third World Conference against Racism, which led to the adoption of the Durban Declaration and Programme of Action. The Durban Declaration, in addition to declaring that the people of Africa had been victimized by slavery and continued to suffer as a result, called for states to adopt specific steps to help combat racism and xenophobia and to protect its victims. During the International Year for People of African Descent, ten years later, the UN called for these efforts to intensify. Two years later, in December 2013, the UN resolved that 1 January 2015 would launch the International Decade for People of African Descent.

On its launch, the UN Deputy High Commissioner for Human Rights Flavia Pansieri said:

The road to a world free from racism, prejudice and stigma is rocky. Combating racial discrimination is a long-term effort. It requires commitment and persistence. People of African descent need encouragement and support. Member States have the moral and legal obligation to provide sustained political and financial backing to make the Decade effective an[d] to continue our path toward equal and just societies.

== Activity within different nations ==
=== Accompong ===
In 2017, the Accompong Maroons launched the Door of Return Initiative in cooperation with Ghana and Nigeria, for which Nigeria unveiled the first symbolic monument during its Diaspora Festival in Badagry. The initiative involves erecting a series of monuments across Africa to signify the openness of Africa towards the Diaspora, and is intended to bring new investment to the continent in areas of tourism and sustainable infrastructure development.

=== Canada ===
On 30 January 2018, the Prime Minister of Canada, Justin Trudeau, announced that the Government of Canada would officially recognize the International Decade for People of African Descent. He appears to have been the first government official in North America to formally announce that his government would support this initiative.

In 2018, the government of Canada "committed $9 million over three years for the Department of Canadian Heritage to enhance local community supports for Black Canadian youth and $10 million over five years to the Public Health Agency of Canada to develop research in support of more culturally-focused mental health programs in Black Canadian communities, for a total of $19 million". In 2019, the Canadian government pledged to provide an additional "$25 million over five years to Employment and Skills Development Canada for projects and capital assistance to celebrate, share knowledge and build capacity in Black Canadian communities". The Canadian government appears to be the first western government to invest several million dollars to improve the lives of individuals of African descent locally.

In 2018, the Bank of Canada released a new 10-dollar note that featured " a portrait of Viola Desmond, a Black Nova Scotian businesswoman who challenged racial segregation at a film theatre in New Glasgow, Nova Scotia, in 1946". According to the bank of Canada's website Viola Desmond's "court case was an inspiration for the pursuit of racial equality across Canada. Viola’s story is part of the permanent collection at the Canadian Museum for Human Rights". Viola's "act of defiance happened nine years before Parks refused to give up her seat on an Alabama bus".

At the end of January 2020, Canada Post released a stamp to commemorate the Colored Hockey League, which was established 22 years before the National Hockey League (NHL). "The stamp features images of players from the Colored Hockey League that operated from 1895 to the 1930s and lists the catchy names of some of the teams -- Jubilees, Stanleys, Eurekas, Sea-Sides, Rangers, Royals and Moss Backs... many of whom were the sons and grandsons of escaped U.S. slaves who sought freedom in Canada."

=== Costa Rica ===
On 24 January 2020, the Government of the Republic of Costa Rica, in concert with UNESCO, celebrated World Day of African and Afrodescendant Culture for the first time.

=== Ghana ===
In September 2018, President Nana Akufo-Addo launched "Year of Return, Ghana 2019". The intent of this initiative was to encourage individuals of African descent to go to Ghana in order to settle and invest in the country and the continent at large. Several prominent individuals, including but not limited to Idris Elba, Boris Kodjoe, Naomi Campbell, Steve Harvey, Cardi B, T.I., Ludacris, Akon, Rosario Dawson, Diggy Simmons, Jidenna, and Nicole Ari Parker, visited Ghana during the first Essence Full Circle Festival there in 2019. The initiative appeared to increase tourism, as Ghana issued 800,000 visas in 2019 for visitors mainly from the Americas, Europe and other African countries.

=== Jamaica ===
In 2019, Jamaica's observance of the International Decade for People of African Descent was launched by Prime Minister Andrew Holness in Kingston, Jamaica.

=== Mexico ===
In 2015, Mexico's population survey reported that 1.38 million Mexicans, which represents about 1.2% of the country's population, identified themselves as being of African heritage. Although this is not a part of the Mexican activities and policies related to the International Decade of African Descent, the first time Afro-Mexicans had the option to identify themselves in a population survey.

=== United States ===
In 2015, the UN marked the beginning of the International Decade for People of African Descent by unveiling a "Permanent Memorial for the Victims of Slavery and the Transatlantic Slave Trade" on 25 March, International Day of Remembrance of the Victims of Slavery and the Transatlantic Slave Trade, at UN Headquarters in New York City. The memorial, entitled The Ark of Return is by Haitian-American architect Rodney Leon, who also designed the African Burial Ground National Monument.

While this activity is located in the US, it is a UN activity that is not sponsored by the United States.

=== United Kingdom ===
So far, the British government has no plans to mark the International Decade for People of African Descent. Its official response refers to the UK's standard anti-discrimination policies, and it makes no specific reference to Africa or people of African descent living in Britain.

== Social media ==
For the first time in December 2019, five women of African descent—Toni-Ann Singh (Miss World), Zozibini Tunzi (Miss Universe), Cheslie Kryst (Miss USA), Kaliegh Garris (Miss Teen USA), and Nia Franklin (Miss America)—held five of the world's major beauty pageant titles at the same time. Notably, South African Zozibini Tunzi "was the first dark-skinned Black woman to wear the crown with short, natural and unprocessed hair".

== See also ==
=== Internal links ===
- History of slavery
- International Day for the Remembrance of the Slave Trade and its Abolition
- International Day of Remembrance of the Victims of Slavery and the Transatlantic Slave Trade
- United Nations Slavery Memorial
- United Nations Declaration of the Trafficking of Enslaved Africans and Racialized Chattel Enslavement of Africans as the Gravest Crime against Humanity
- United Nations Permanent Forum on People of African Descent

=== External links ===
- United Nations - International Decade for People of African Descent
