= International Year to Commemorate the Struggle Against Slavery and Its Abolition =

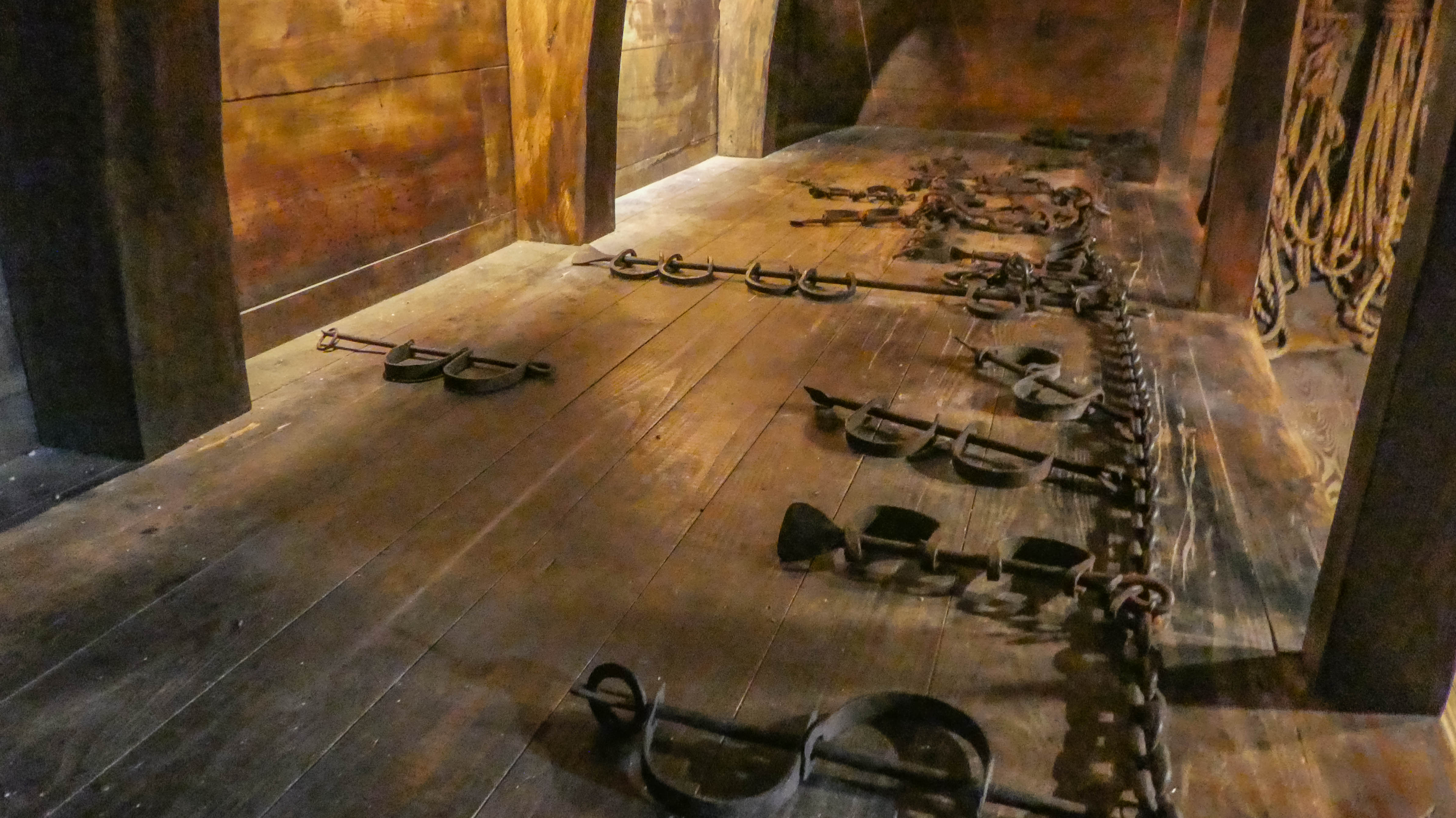

The United Nations General Assembly declared 2004 as the International Year to Commemorate the Struggle against Slavery and its Abolition (having welcomed the fact that UNESCO had proclaimed it as such earlier).

The General Assembly resolution in its entirety (of which this declaration was a single paragraph) was voted against by the Israel, Palau and the United States, with Australia and Canada abstaining.

The United Nations International Years, beginning with the World Refugee Year in 1959/1960, are designated in order to focus world attention on important issues. The proclamation of an international year to commemorate the struggle against slavery and its abolition marked the bicentenary of the proclamation of the first black state, Haiti, as well as the reunion of the peoples of Africa, the Americas, the Caribbean and Europe.

Among the initiatives that marked the commemorative year was a virtual exhibition, Lest We Forget: The Triumph over Slavery, created by the Schomburg Center for Research in Black Culture and New York Public Library.

Another effort that was launched during the year was a research and information programme, Forgotten Slaves. The programme was implemented by the French Marine Archaeology Group (GRAN) with the support of UNESCO. It was inspired by the wreck of the slave ship l'Utile off the shores of the Tromelin Island in the Indian Ocean in 1761 and was intended to be part of an information campaign to raise awareness of both the history of slavery and modern forms of slavery.

== See also ==
- International Day for the Abolition of Slavery
- United Nations International Years
- Abolitionism
