= International Day of Remembrance of the Victims of Slavery and the Transatlantic Slave Trade =

Annual observance on 25 March

- Observed by: globally
- Type: International
- Date: 25 March
- Next time: 25 March 2027
- Frequency: annual

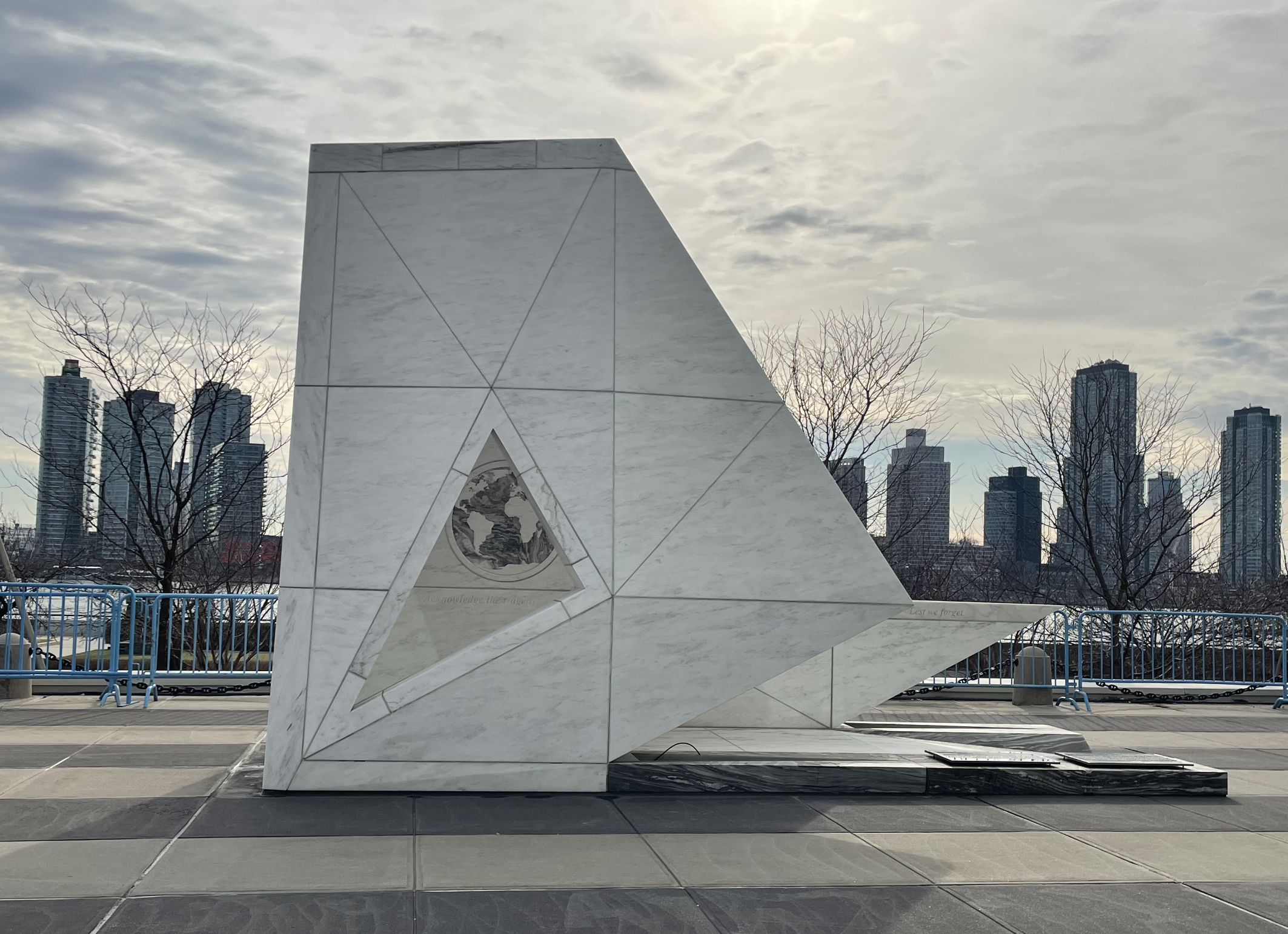
The United Nations slavery memorial

International Day of Remembrance of the Victims of Slavery and the Transatlantic Slave Trade is a United Nations (UN) international observance designated in 2007 to be marked on 25 March every year.

The day honours and remembers those who suffered and died as a consequence of the transatlantic slave trade, which has been called "the worst violation of human rights in history", in which over 400 years more than 15 million men, women and children were the victims.

== History ==
It was first observed in 2008 with the theme "Breaking the Silence, Lest We Forget". The theme of 2015 was "Women and Slavery". The International Day also "aims at raising awareness about the dangers of racism and prejudice today".

With 2015 marking the start of the UN's International Decade for People of African Descent, a permanent memorial was unveiled at the UN headquarters in New York, entitled "The Ark of Return" and designed by Haitian-American architect Rodney Leon, who also designed the African Burial Ground National Monument.

In 2026, on the occasion of the International Day, the United Nations General Assembly approved a United Nations Declaration of the Trafficking of Enslaved Africans and Racialized Chattel Enslavement of Africans as the Gravest Crime against Humanity (UNDOTEA).

== See also ==
- History of slavery
- International Day for the Remembrance of the Slave Trade and its Abolition
- United Nations Slavery Memorial
- United Nations Declaration of the Trafficking of Enslaved Africans and Racialized Chattel Enslavement of Africans as the Gravest Crime against Humanity
- United Nations Permanent Forum on People of African Descent
- International Decade for People of African Descent
- Supplementary Convention on the Abolition of Slavery
