= United Nations Slavery Memorial =

Monument in New York City, United States

Coordinates: 40°45′1.7″N 73°58′0.8″W

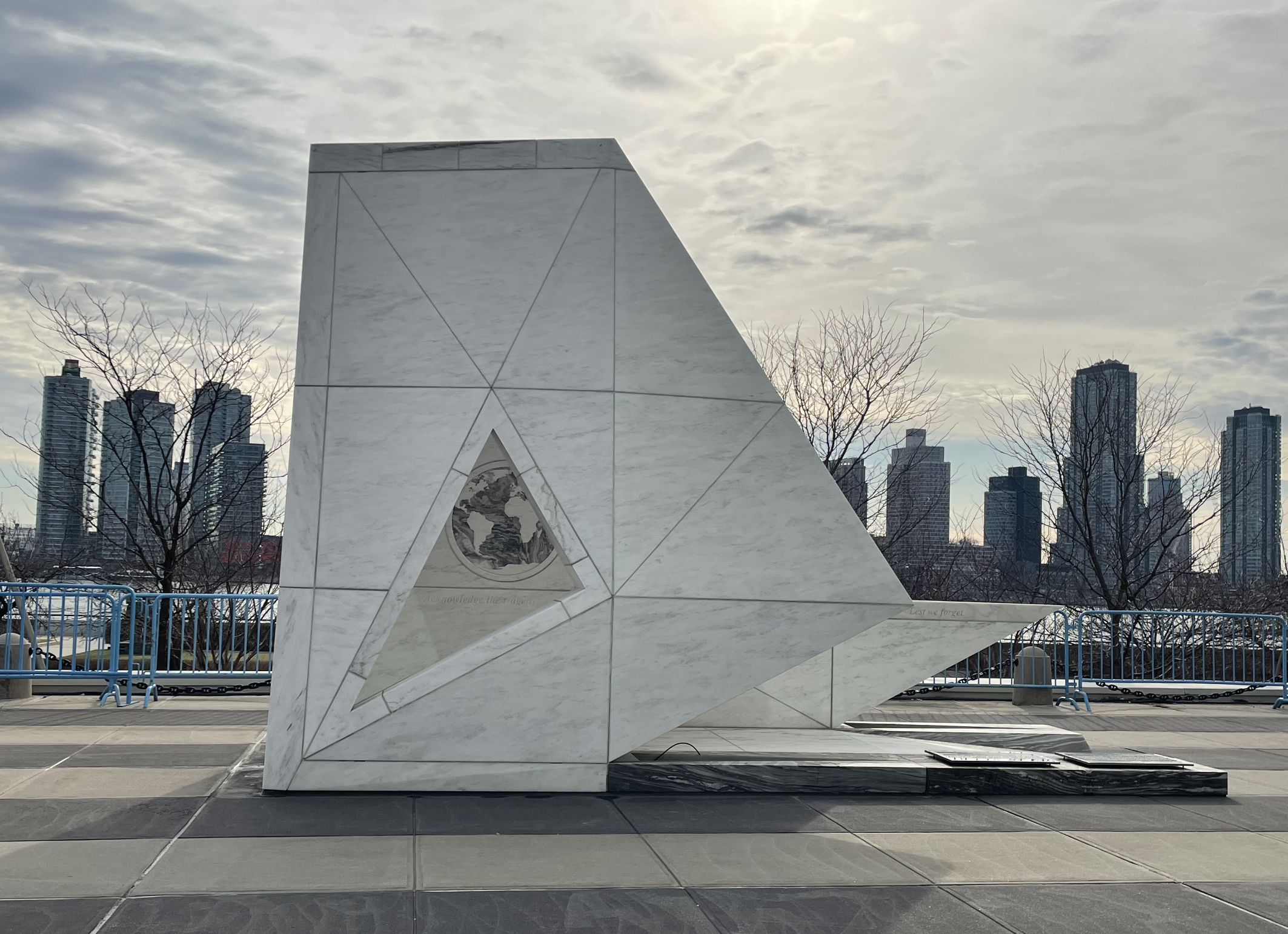
View of the memorial from the outside

The United Nations Slavery Memorial, officially known as The Ark of Return – The Permanent Memorial at the United Nations in Honour of the Victims of Slavery and the Transatlantic Slave Trade, is an installation at the Visitors' Plaza of the Headquarters of the United Nations in New York City, intended as a permanent reminder of the long-lasting effects of slavery and the Transatlantic slave trade. It was designed by Rodney Leon, a Haitian-American architect, and installed in 2015.

It includes three main elements: a large triangular sculpture with a map depicting the triangular slave trade; a prone human figure depicting those who were transported overseas enslaved; and a reflecting pool mean to honour the memory of those who died in slavery.

== Description ==
The memorial's name is drawn from the castle on the island of Gorée, Senegal, where enslaved people were held before being shipped across the ocean. One of the exits of the castle is known as "the door of no return". The memorial is meant to serve as "a spiritual place of return".

The structure, which is meant to evoke the shape of a slave ship, is 30 feet tall and made of triangular white marble panels supported by a steel frame, which represent the triangular shipping routes of the slave trade. A map showing these routes have been etched into one of the interior panels. Visitors are able to walk through the structure, representing the journeys of enslaved people.

Also inside the structure is a horizontal statue of an androgynous figure carved from black Zimbabwe granite, meant to represent the "human spirit" and the deaths of all those who died due to the slave trade. Above the statue is an etched depiction of a crowded slave ship. Tears run down the figure's face into a triangular reflecting pool.

== History ==
The Slavery Memorial concept came from various resolutions adopted by the UN General Assembly including A/RES/62/122, A/RES/63/5, and the Durban Declaration.

Haitian-American architect Rodney Leon was chosen to design the memorial in 2013, his design having won out of a total 310 entries from 83 countries. Nicolas Grun and Pierre Laurent were named as second place winners for their design, Mémorial d’Ebène, and two designs were named as third place winners: Sofia Castelo's Middle Passage, and The Wounded Earth, designed by Carlo Gondolfi, Paola Passeri, Alessandra Ripa, and Monica Sacchetti.

The project was supported by the Permanent Memorial Trust Fund and from India, which contributed US$250,000; the estimated cost of the project prior to its construction was 4.5 million dollars. The white marble needed for the project was sourced from Vermont.

Initially the memorial was scheduled to be unveiled in 2014, in time for the 69th session of the general assembly. This was pushed back to 2015, both due to funding shortfalls and so its installation would coincide with the International Decade for People of African Descent, which started in 2015.

The memorial was officially unveiled on March 25, 2015, the International Day of Remembrance of the Victims of Slavery and the Transatlantic Slave Trade. The design won one of the Pinnacle Awards of the Marble Institute of America later that year.

== Advisory board ==
- Goodwill ambassadors: Russell Simmons (entrepreneur, philanthropist)
- Chair: Mr. Howard Dodson (Schomburg Center for Research in Black Culture)
- Cheik Diarra (Microsoft Middle East and Africa)
- Ellen Haddigan (Diamond Empowerment Fund)
- David Scheider (The Coca-Cola Company)
- Harriet Mouchly-Weiss (Kreab Gavin ANderson)
- Joseph Daniel (National September 11 Memorial & Museum at the World Trade Center)
- David Dinkins (School of International Public Affairs)
- Peter Tichansky (Business Council for International Understanding)
- Luis Ubinas (Ford Foundation)
- Congressman Gregory W. Meeks
- Javier Evans (senior premier corporate and professionals relationship manager, HSBC)

== Partners ==
- CARICOM
- United Nations Office for Partnerships
- Jamaica Mission
- African Union

== See also ==
- United Nations Art Collection
