= Routes of Enslaved Peoples =

UNESCO initiative

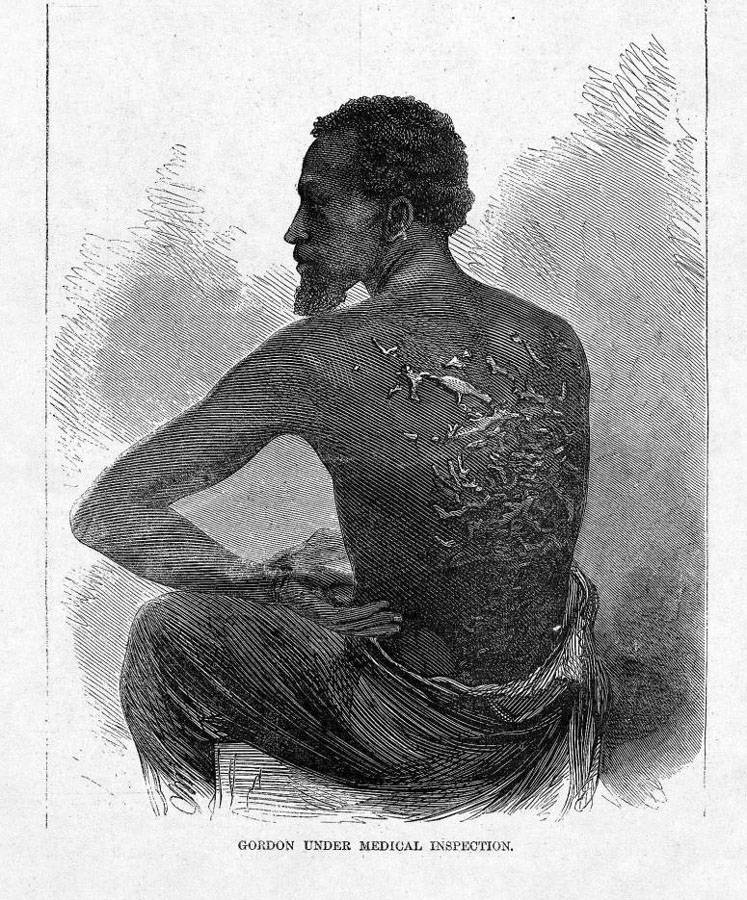
"Whipped Gordon", Harpers

Routes of Enslaved Peoples is a UNESCO initiative launched in 1994 in Ouidah, Benin. Called The Slave Route Project until 2022, it aims to promote intercultural dialogue about the Atlantic slave trade, and the history of slavery in general.

== Commemorations ==
Such commemorative days for slavery and its victims include:

- International Day of Remembrance of the Victims of Slavery and the Transatlantic Slave Trade (25 March)
- International Day for the Remembrance of the Slave Trade and its Abolition (23 August)
- International Day for the Abolition of Slavery (2 December)
- International Year to Commemorate the Struggle against Slavery and its Abolition (2004)
- 2011: The UN International Year for People of African Descent

== Pedagogical initiatives ==
=== Slavery sites around the Atlantic ===
UNESCO with the Colonial Williamsburg Foundation, have created and maintains the "Slavery and Remembrance" project to "engage[] the public as well as experts with issues relating to slavery, slave trade, and ways in which both are remembered today throughout the Atlantic world." The following historic sites, memorials, and organizations related to the history of Atlantic slavery, include:

- Afro-Peruvian Museum, Peru
- Alejandro de Humboldt National Park, Cuba
- Angerona Coffee Plantation, Cuba
- Archaeological landscape of the first coffee plantations of southeastern Cuba
- Barbados Museum and Historical Society
- Beausoleil Plantation, Guadeloupe (Fr.)
- Blue and John Crow Mountains National Park, Jamaica
- Chateau de Joux, France
- The Colonial Williamsburg Foundation, United States
- The Departmental Museum Victor Schœlcher, Guadeloupe (Fr.)
- EUROTAST, Denmark
- Fidelin Kiln, Guadeloupe (Fr.)
- Fort Fleur-d’Epée, Guadeloupe (Fr.)
- Fort Louis Delgrès Guadeloupe (Fr.)
- Ghana Museums and Monuments, Ghana
- Historic Camagüey, Cuba
- Historic Cienfuegos, Cuba
- Historic Havana and Fortifications, Cuba
- Historic Trinidad: the Urban Center and the Valley of the Sugar Factories, Cuba
- House of Negritude and Human Rights, France
- Hull Museums, United Kingdom
- Indigo Plantations of the East Coast, Guadeloupe (Fr.)
- International Slavery Museum, United Kingdom
- L’Anse à la Barque Indigo Plantation, Guadeloupe (Fr.)
- La Grivelière Plantation, Guadeloupe (Fr.)
- La Mahaudière Plantation, Guadeloupe (Fr.)
- Les Rotours Canal, Guadeloupe (Fr.)
- Maison Abbé Grégoire, France
- Middle Passage Ceremonies and Port Markers Project, United States
- Monument to Abolition of Slavery, Guadeloupe (Fr.)
- Municipal Museum of Guanabacoa, Cuba
- Municipalities of Regla-Guanabacoa, Cuba
- Murat Plantation, Guadeloupe (Fr)
- Museum of Aquitaine, France
- Museum of London Docklands, United Kingdom
- Nantes History Museum, France
- National Park Service Network to Freedom,
- Néron Plantation, Guadeloupe (Fr)
- Oak Alley Foundation, United States
- Periwinkle Initiative, United States
- Punch Pond, Guadeloupe (Fr.)
- Roussel-Trianon Plantation Guadeloupe (Fr.)
- Royall House and Slave Quarters, United States
- Ruins of La Demajagua Sugar Factory, Cuba
- San Severino Castle, Cuba
- Schomburg Center for Research in Black Culture, United States
- Slave Burial Ground of Anse Sainte-Marguerite, Guadeloupe (Fr.)
- The Slave Cell of Belmont Plantation, Guadeloupe (Fr.)
- Slave History Museum, Nigeria
- The Slave Route, Cuba
- The Slave Route, Guadeloupe (Fr.)
- Slavery and Revolution, United Kingdom
- Thomas Jefferson Foundation Monticello, United States
- El Cobre Town and Cobre mine, Cuba
- Tumba Francesa, Cuba
- Turks & Caicos National Museum, Turks and Caicos Islands
- Vanibel Plantation, Guadeloupe, Fr.
- Viñales Valley, Cuba
- Whitney Plantation, United States
