= Virginia Maksymowicz =

American artist (born 1952)

- Born: February 19, 1952 (age 74); Bay Ridge, Brooklyn
- Education: University of California, San Diego
- Known for: Sculpture

Virginia Maksymowicz (born February 19, 1952) is an American artist whose sculptural installations incorporate a variety of media. She lives in Philadelphia, PA and is married to artist-photographer, Blaise Tobia.

== Early life and education ==
Maksymowicz was born in Bay Ridge, Brooklyn (New York) to working-class parents of Polish-Irish-German-English heritage. Her father worked as a bartender at the Seafarers International Union. She studied art on the undergraduate level at Brooklyn College, CUNY (BA 1973) with Lucas Samaras, Ronald Mehlman, David Sawin, Morris Dorsky, Murray Israel and Walter Rosenblum. From 1973 to 1974 she attended the Brooklyn Museum Art School where she studied figurative sculpture with Barney Hodes. She met Blaise Tobia at Brooklyn College and in 1974, both Maksymowicz and Tobia entered the MFA program at the University of California, San Diego, where each earned an MFA (1977). Maksymowicz worked with Allan Kaprow, Newton & Helen Harrison, Eleanor & David Antin, Ree Morton, Moira Roth, Harold Cohen and David Ross. During that time, she was a research assistant to Gerry MacAllister, the Director of the Mandeville Gallery, which put her in contact with artists such as Suzanne Lacy, Mary Beth Edelson, Miriam Shapiro and Barbara Smith.

During the 1970s UCSD was a catalyst for political and feminist art. When Maksymowicz and Tobia arrived, the department was just about to move into the newly built, Quincy Jones-designed, Mandeville Center. Recent MFAs Martha Rosler and Allan Sekula were still a presence in the department. Allan Kaprow had just left Cal Arts to take up his new post in San Diego. Moira Roth had come down from UC Irvine. Eleanor Antin had recently finished 100 Boots; David Antin was teaching semiotics. Newton and Helen Harrison were growing catfish, brine shrimp and orange trees and beginning to develop their dialogue-based, map-like proposals with the Lagoon Cycle. Performance artist Linda Montano built an enclosure in one of the Mandeville classrooms and lived in it for five days as part of a performance called Learning to Talk. Downstairs in the Music Department, Pauline Oliveros directed the Center for Music Experiment. Visitors included Yvonne Rainer, William Wegman, Laurie Anderson, Peter Frank, the Kipper Kids and Paul McCarthy.

During graduate school, Maksymowicz began casting the human body, creating a series of outdoor sculptures that became part of the ground itself. Many of these were intended to self-destruct, either because they were made of unfired clay or because they were intentionally made to crack and shatter. One sculpture, however, was designed differently. Called Thirty Blocks, the piece was installed in a memorial garden made by sculpture professor Michael Todd and a group of undergraduate students as a memorial to George Winne, a UCSD history major who had set himself on fire in protest of the Vietnam war. Without securing administrative permission, in 1976 Maksymowicz and Tobia dug a 4-foot by 6-foot impression in the earth and positioned the blocks, with the hope that it would last the year. Forty years later, it remains, having gained mythical status as a relic of Winne's actual immolation.

In February 1977, the College Art Association held its annual conference in Los Angeles. David Ross, a curator at the Long Beach Museum of Art, had managed to commandeer a channel on the Hilton's closed circuit TV. The broadcasts included Suzanne Lacy in her hotel room tending to a bedridden, dead sheep and a talk show moderated by Ross where Harry Kipper was interviewed, and Linda Montano threaded dental floss up her nose and pulled it out her mouth. The Women's Caucus for Art and the Women's Building were already five years old, and the feminist scene had begun to flourish. Maksymowicz witnessed outrageous performances by women artists both in the hotel lobby and around town. In 1978, Maksymowicz joined the Women's Caucus for Art; she remains a member to this day.

== Career ==
Maksymowicz and Tobia returned to New York City, where they both were hired for the Cultural Council Foundation CETA Artists Project and worked as artists in community residence assignments during 1978 and 1979. During the project, Maksymowicz met and worked with visual artists Ursula von Rydingsvard, Willie Birch, Herman Cherry, Cynthia Mailman, Susan Share, Dawoud Bey and Christy Rupp; writers/poets Judd Tully, Bob Holman and Sandra Esteves; and dancers Audrey Jung and Jane Goldberg. As a CETA artist, Maksymowicz taught classes, mounted exhibitions and produced several public artworks.

During the 1980s, after having taught in temporary positions at Oberlin College and Wayne State University, Maksymowicz (with Tobia) moved back to Brooklyn. She worked as executive director for Amos Eno Gallery (1983–86), an artist cooperative then in SoHo, and as Articles Editor for Art & Artists magazine, published by the Foundation for the Community of Artists. She became involved with some of the politically active artists' groups active at the time: Art Against Apartheid, Artists for Nuclear Disarmament, Artists Call Against U.S. Intervention in Central America, Visual AIDs, and Political Art Documentation/Distribution. Her sculptural installation, On The Street, at Federal Hall National Memorial on Wall Street, sponsored by the Lower Manhattan Cultural Council, is documented in PAD/D's publication, Upfront. During this time, she crossed paths with Lucy Lippard, Herb Perr, Greg Scholette, Jimmie Durham, Faith Ringgold, Clarissa Sligh and Emma Amos, as well as many activists and feminist artists.

In 1984, she was awarded a National Endowment for the Arts fellowship in sculpture, as well as several Artists Space/Artists Grants.

Maksymowicz subsidized her income by working as a secretarial temp on Wall Street, and produced a body of work based on her experiences there as well as her experiences during the two years she spent in Detroit. Home of Model T, originally exhibited at the Contemporary Art Institute of Detroit, was shown in New York as part of "Precious: An American Cottage Industry of the Eighties." Her installation, Pennies from Heaven, was part of the "Money/Power" exhibition (along with Connie Samaras and Ligorano/Reese) at the Franklin Furnace. Other works from this period include Excess Assets, Homeless Woman Kills Wall Street Financier and Stayin' Alive, the latter of which was shown in the windows of 10 on 8 in Manhattan. Almost three decades later, some of these works were shown in a retrospective in Philadelphia in connection with the Occupy Wall Street movement.

In 1991, Maksymowicz and Tobia moved to Philadelphia. Maksymowicz began teaching in part-time and visiting positions at a number of colleges and universities. Maksymowicz continued her affiliation with the Women's Caucus for Art, and her work began to shift more decisively towards the female body as social metaphor. Lily of the Mohawks, which treats the life of Kateri Tekakwitha, who has been beatified by the Roman Catholic Church, was made in response to a call for artworks by the addressing the cinquecentennial of Columbus's arrival in the new world. It was eventually exhibited in 1995 at the Mitchell Museum in Illinois. More works followed, with Maksymowicz casting her own body and the bodies of other women.

In the year 2000, Maksymowicz assumed a full-time position as a sculpture professor at Franklin & Marshall College in Lancaster, Pennsylvania. Her sculptural installations became increasingly referential to the architecture of the various exhibition spaces (The Physical Boundaries of This World at the Elizabeth Foundation for the Arts, and Peripheral Vision at the Fort Collins Museum of Art). In 2007, as part of an artist-in-residence program at the Powel House Museum that included Karen Kilimnik and Roxanna Perez Mendez, she created Rules of Civility, a sculpture/audio installation that extended throughout the house. In 2006, while she was a visiting artist at the American Academy in Rome, her work began to focus upon the architectural convention of the caryatid. She returned to the AAR in 2012 and 2014, and has traveled to Vienna and Munich, and to cities in the U.S., in search of these female figures.

By referencing caryatids and canephorae, historical figures and architectural elements in the form of women, Maksymowicz addresses the significance and power of women as structural support for society. She sees this imagery as a metaphor for the women as the pillars of civilization, stating, "My current interest in the female body lies in exploring metaphors for the foundational but often unrecognized role of women in supporting social structures. These include the architectural forms of canephorae and caryatids, columns and capitals, and their mythological underpinnings through Demeter, Persephone, and the bread of life."

== Awards ==
Maksymowicz has been the recipient of a number of grants and awards including a National Endowment for the Arts fellowship in sculpture (1984), Artists Space/Artists Grants (1985, 87, 88), an Art Matters Incorporated artist fellowship (1988), Leeway Foundation Window of Opportunity grant (1999), Pennsylvania Council on the Arts SOS Grants (2002; 2005). She has been a visiting artist at the American Academy in Rome (2006; 2012; 2014), an artist-in-residence at the Powel House Museum in Philadelphia (2006–07), and a fellow at the Vermont Studio Center (2007).

Maksymowicz's artwork has been reviewed in Sculpture Magazine, Philadelphia Artblog, The New York Times, New York Newsday, the New Art Examiner and the Philadelphia Inquirer. Her series, The History of Art, appears on the cover of The Female Body, published by the University of Michigan Press.

== Bibliography ==
• Archino, Sarah, “Strong Supports,” article, Sculpture Magazine, vol. 35, no.6, July/August 2016

• Hobbs, Margot, Structural Transparencies, catalog essay, Lancaster, PA: Phillips Museum of Art, March 2018

• Orvell, Miles, “Blaise Tobia and Virginia Maksymowicz and their ‘collaborative enterprise in art and life’,” article, Philadelphia Artblog, May 20, 2024

• Kirsh, Andrea, The Lightness of Bearing, catalog essay, Glassboro, PA: Rowan University, September 2023

• Murphy, Mary, “Virginia Maksymowicz and the ‘Lightness of Bearing’ at Rowan University Art Gallery,” exhibition review, Philadelphia Artblog, October 20, 2024
