= Art Workers News and Art & Artists =

Art Workers News, also known as Art & Artists, was the highly influential artist-run publication of the Foundation for the Community of Artists (FCA), an organization that grew out of the National Art Workers Community (a splinter group of the Art Workers’ Coalition). From 1971 to 1989, the publication was the paper of record for the world of working artists. Its circulation reached a high of 40,000 subscribers.

Originally a four-page newsletter called The Art Workers Newsletter, the publication grew into a monthly newspaper called Artworkers News. During the early 1980s, FCA changed the publication's name to Art&Artists and made it a bi-monthly.

The initial staff included Mary Albanese, Pamela Bickford, Bernie Brown (columnist for the New York Post), Sandy Relis, Alex Gross (who in protest to AT&T wore part of a dial telephone around his neck), Peter Leggieri and Jacqueline Skiles. Subsequently, Robert Perlmutter (of Pearl Paint), Daniel Grant, Eva Cockcroft, Larry Rosing, Steven s’Soreff and illustrator Barbara Nessim joined.

Rather than reviewing shows, AWN/A&A focused on topics central to the lives of working artists in the 1970s and ’80s, (and continuing today): artist housing, health hazards, business practices, health insurance, women’s issues, issues affecting artists of color, law and the arts and censorship were impacting the daily life of artists. The publication featured, as well, contemporary theories and philosophies in the arts, general news articles, a select number of book reviews, commentaries, editorials and special issues.

The special issues were wide-ranging, reflecting the times and the interests of the editors and writers who were involved at a given time over the course of its existence.

Special issues included: “Art Against Apartheid.” “Art and Sports,” “Are There Too Many Artists?,” “Tilted Arc by Richard Serra,” "Museums," and “Artists Against US Intervention in Central America.”

Art Workers News was also the publication of record for the Comprehensive Employment Act (CETA) Artists Program in New York City and documented the work of artists in all media associated with the project.

AWN/A&A produced 160 issues over eighteen years. Editors and production staff were volunteers; writers and photographers were paid (minimally) in accordance with the belief that people, including artists and writers, deserved to be paid for their work. The journal newspaper gave voice to many artists, critics and journalists who were prominent in the cultural milieu of its time, as well as to younger professionals at the start of their careers.

Many of the original newsprint issues and some microfiche editions are catalogued in libraries across the U.S., Canada and Australia. The Fales Library at New York University has most of the volumes, and is a source for researchers, artists, art historians, students and scholars. Gwen Allen, a professor at San Francisco State University includes additional information about the publication in her book, Artists’ Magazines: An Alternative Space for Art.

Elliott Barowitz, painter, media artist and writer was the long-time Executive Editor of the journal and remains keeper of its archives; Senior and Associate Editors, and frequent contributors included artists Walter Thompson, Blaise Tobia and Virginia Maksymowicz; artist/photographer Walter Weissman, and arts writer, Daniel Grant.

The list of contributors to the publication is long and distinguished. It includes men and women early in their careers who went on to become extremely well known writers, artists, editors, curators and critics. Among them are: Lawrence Alloway, Benny Andrews, Lori Antonacci, Dore Ashton, Rudolf Baranik, Jane Barowitz, Gregory Battcock, Pamela Bickart, Bernie Brown, Eva Cockcroft, Tad Crawford, Jimmie Durham, Saunders Ellis, Josephine Gear, Dan Grant, Eunice Golden, Leon Golub, Adam Gopnik, Alex Gross, John Hanhardt, Michael Harrington, Stephanie Harrington, Baird Jones, Marc Kostabi, Barbara Kruger, Tuli Kupferberg, Donald Kuspit, Peter Leggieri, Lucy Lippard, Gerald Marzorati, Carl Methfessel, Michael McCann, Cynthia Navaretta, Barbara Nessim, Susan Ortega, Howardina Pindell, Mel Rosenthal, Larry Rosing, Laurin Raiken, Lee Rosenbaum, Barnaby Ruhe, Nancy St. Paul, Irving Sandler, Jacqueline Skyles, Stephen S’soreff, Juan Sanchez, Nancy Spero, May Stevens, Ted Striggles, Marcia Tucker, Judd Tully, David Troy, Allan Wallach, Tim Yohn, and many others.

== Bibliographic citations ==
- Alberto, Alexander and Stimson, Blake, Conceptual Art: A Critical Anthology, Cambridge, MA: MIT Press, 1999
- Allen, Gwen, Artists’ Magazines: An Alternative Space for Art, Cambridge, MA: MIT Press, 2011
- Bryan-Wilson, Julia, Art Workers: Radical Practice in the Vietnam War Era, University of California Press, 2011
- Kostelanetz, Richard, A Dictionary of the Avant Gardes, New York, NY: Rutledge, 2011
- Skiles, Jacqueline, “The National Art Workers' Community: Still Struggling,” Art Journal, Volume 34, Issue 4, 1975
