= Ted Berger =

American arts activist (1940–2026)

Theodore Sheldon Berger (July 9, 1940 – January 29, 2026) was an American arts activist based in New York City, who was one of the creators of the Cultural Council Foundation's Artists Project, which grew to be the largest CETA art program in the US.

Along with serving as Executive Director Emeritus of the New York Foundation for the Arts, from which he retired in 2005, Berger served as the Executive Director of NYCreates. He first joined NYFA in 1973 as the United States' first statewide Artists-in-Schools Coordinator.

Berger was born in Providence, Rhode Island, in 1940, to Freda and George Berger. He was married to Asya Eliash for more than 60 years. Berger died in Manhattan on January 29, 2026, at the age of 85. He is survived by their son, Jonathan.
