= Blaise Tobia =

Blaise Tobia (born January 20, 1953) is a contemporary artist and photographer who lives and works in Philadelphia, Pennsylvania. He is married to sculptor, Virginia Maksymowicz. Together they maintain TandM Arts Studio.

== Early life and education ==
Tobia was born in Brooklyn, New York. He attended Stuyvesant High School, and went on to study art at Brooklyn College, CUNY: his principal photography teacher was Walter Rosenblum; he studied drawing with Philip Pearlstein and sculpture with Ron Mehlman. After receiving his BA in 1974, he headed for California, to become part of the MFA program at the University of California, San Diego. During that trip, he documented two significant artworks on the ranch of Stanley Marsh 3: Robert Smithson's Amarillo Ramp and the then-recently completed Ant Farm's Cadillac Ranch. Tobia's unique book, Cadillac Ranch Sequences, was accepted into the Ant Farm's archive in 2003.

At UCSD, he studied primarily with photographers Fred Lonidier and Phel Steinmetz, as well as with Allan Kaprow and the artists Newton and Helen Harrison. He worked as a Research Assistant for the school's Mandeville Gallery; among his duties he acted as a photographer and facilitator for performance artists Lynn Hershman, Laurie Anderson and Norma Jean Deák.

== Career ==
In 1977, Tobia and Maksymowicz returned to New York City, where they both worked for the NYC CETA Artists Project from 1978 to 1979. Tobia was a member of the team documenting what was the largest federally-funded arts project since the WPA. His photos of participating artists such as Ursula von Rydingsvard and Willie Birch appear in print in the Cultural Council Foundation Artists Project Complete archives of the CCF Artist Project are housed in the New York City Department of Records and some images are in the collection of the Museum of the City of New York.

In 1980, Tobia and Maksymowicz moved to Oberlin, Ohio, where he became a founding member of the town's alternate newspaper, The Local Paper. In 1981 they moved to Detroit, where Tobia taught photography part-time at Wayne State University and did extensive photographic documentation of Detroit; his series on converted bank buildings, Pillars of the Community is represented in Site Matters: Design Concepts, Histories, and Strategies.

Back in New York City in 1983, Tobia become an editor of the monthly publication of the Foundation for the Community of Artists, Artworkers News, later renamed Art&Artists working with its chief editor, Elliott Barowitz. He became active with a variety of politically oriented artists' groups such as Art Against Apartheid, Artists Call Against U.S. Intervention in Central America and Political Art Documentation/Distribution. During this period he took his first courses in computer imaging, at Pratt Institute and SVA.

In 1985, Tobia began splitting his time between New York City and Philadelphia when he was hired as an assistant professor by Drexel University. He and another faculty member, Stuart Rome, co-developed a major in photography for Drexel. After receiving tenure, in 1992, he became the first director of that program, which was among the earliest to require a dual professional/fine-art course of study as well as courses in digital photography. Continuing to pursue his interests in digital technologies, he led the process of developing a new major in digital media at Drexel and moved into that program in 2000. In 2007, he was welcomed into Drexel's Art & Art History Department (for which, as of 2019, he is professor emeritus).

== Awards ==
Tobia has received grants from the Pennsylvania Council on the Arts and Drexel University. He has been a visiting artist at the Vermont Studio Center (2007) and the American Academy in Rome (2006; 2012; 2014).

His photographs have been included in Sculpture Magazine, Leonardo Magazine, and in books such as Lure of the Local and Site Matters and other publications.
