= Art Bastard =

2016 American documentary by Victor Kanefsky

Art Bastard (2016)
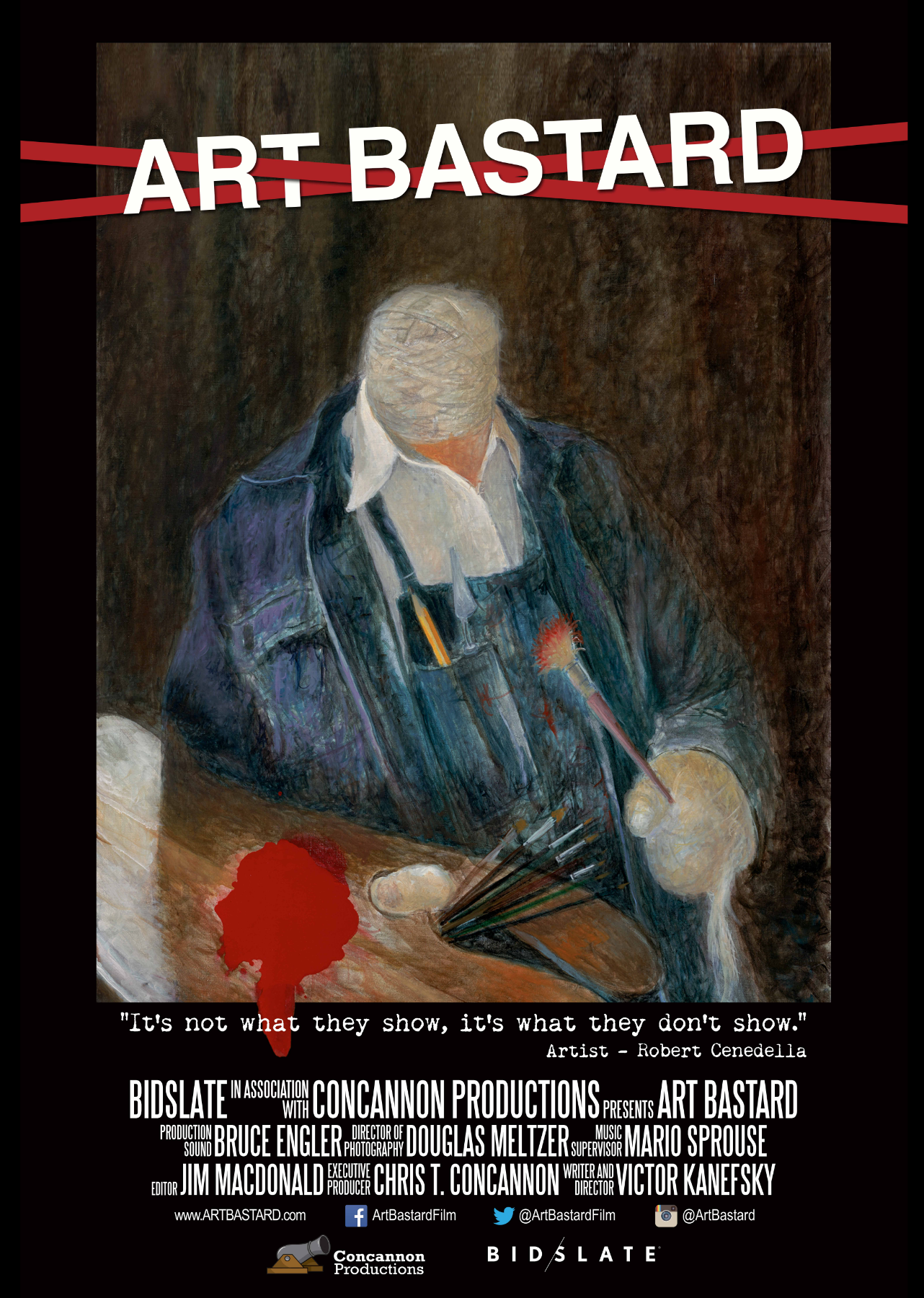
- Theatrical poster
- Directed by: Victor Kanefsky
- Written by: Victor Kanefsky
- Produced by: Chris T. Concannon
- Starring: Robert Cenedella; Richard Armstrong (museum director); Marvin Kitman; Jack Rollins (producer); Victor Navasky; Sarah Thornton; Judd Tully; Sirio Maccioni
- Edited by: Jim MacDonald
- Music by: Mario Sprouse
- Distributed by: BidSlate
- Release dates: April 26, 2016 (Newport Beach Film Festival); June 3, 2016 (United States)
- Running time: 85 Minutes
- Country: United States
- Language: English

Art Bastard is a 2016 documentary film written and directed by Victor Kanefsky. It details the life of Artist Robert Cenedella and explains how specific moments and experiences from childhood to present day influenced his style as a New York Artist. The film was well received by critics and audiences alike, and garnered attention when it became an Official Selection at the Newport Beach Film Festival on April 25, 2016. Shortly thereafter, it was publicly released to select movie theaters across the United States on June 3, 2016, and began receiving critical acclaim in both domestic and international film festivals by winning several awards, including Best Documentary at Idyllwild International Festival of Cinema (2016), the Manchester Film Festival (2016), East Hampton TV Festival at Guild Hall of East Hampton (2019), and at the NYC International Film Festival (2019).

== Awards ==
Art Bastard was awarded several accolades before and after its official release on June 3, 2016:

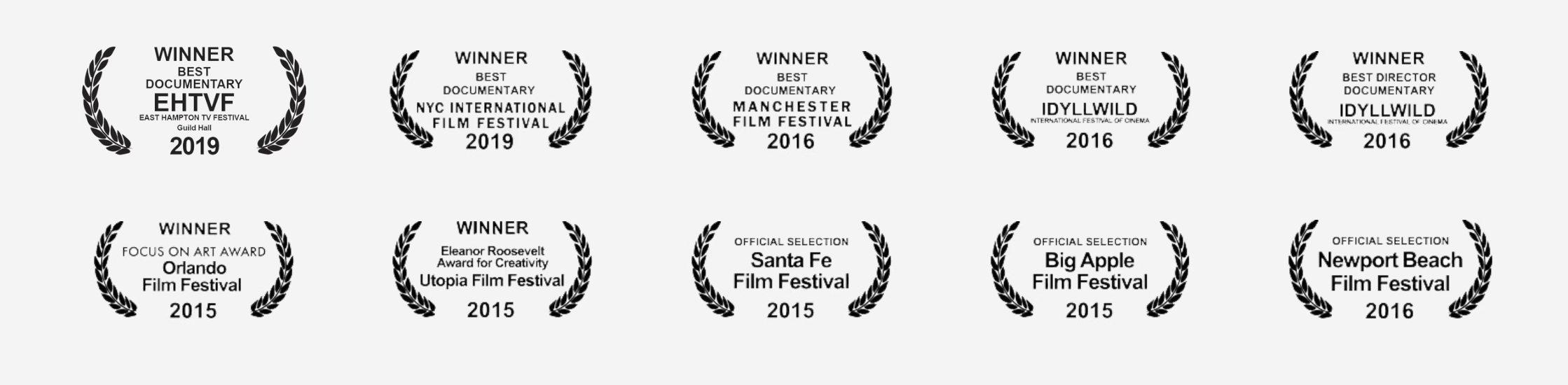
Awards won by the film documentary, Art Bastard (2016)

- WINNER – Best Documentary Award – East Hampton TV Festival at Guild Hall of East Hampton (2019)
- WINNER – Best Documentary Award – NYC International Film Festival (2019)
- WINNER – Best Documentary Award – Manchester Film Festival (2016)
- WINNER – Best Documentary Award – Idyllwild International Festival of Cinema (2016)
- WINNER – Best Director Award – Idyllwild International Festival of Cinema (2016)
- WINNER – Focus on Art Award – Orlando Film Festival (2015)
- WINNER – Eleanor Roosevelt Award for Creativity – Utopia Film Festival (2015)

It was also the Official Selection at the following film festivals:

- Official Selection – Newport Beach Film Festival (2016)
- Official Selection – Big Apple Film Festival (2015)
- Official Selection – Santa Fe Film Festival (2015)

== People interviewed ==
In order of appearance:

- Robert Cenedella – Artist, entrepreneur & teacher
- Joan Cenedella – Writer, author & teacher (Robert's sister)
- Jess Korman – Writer, author & singer-songwriter
- Stephen Geller – Magazine publisher & art collector
- Liz Cenedella – Fabric artist & business owner (Robert's wife)
- Richard Armstrong – Director, Solomon R. Guggenheim Museum
- Marvin Kitman – Writer, author, TV critic for New York Newsday
- Ed McCormack – Managing Editor, Gallery & Studio art magazine
- David Cenedella – Professor, Baruch College (Robert's son)
- Jack Rollins – Film producer & business manager for Woody Allen
- Paul Zerler (1922–2014) – Art expert & appraiser for the Titanic
- Victor Navasky – Publisher emeritus of The Nation
- Lauren Purje – Illustrator Artist, former Art Students League of New York (ASL) student
- Kelly Crow – Art reporter, The Wall Street Journal
- Morgan Long – Director of Art Investment, The Fine Art Fund Group
- Sarah Thornton – Writer, author & sociologist of art
- Judd Tully – Art critic, journalist, editor-at-large, Art+Auction magazine
- Pamela Fiori – Writer, journalist, magazine Editor-In-Chief
- Sirio Maccioni – Entrepreneur, owner of French restaurant, Le Cirque
- George Hudson (1937–2013) – Professor of English, Colgate University
- Susan Reingold – Art Students League of New York (ASL) art student

== Reviews ==
The documentary received positive reviews from its audience, including an 86% on Rotten Tomatoes based on 22 critic reviews, with an average rating of 7.3/10. It was reviewed by numerous publications, and was selected as a New York Times 'NYT Critic's Pick' by Stephen Holden.

Below are excerpts from some of the Film Critic reviews for Art Bastard:

- Stephen Holden from The New York Times wrote:
  - "It's no what they show, it's what they don't show," the painter Robert Cenedella complains in "Art Bastard," Victor Kanefsky's robust, plain-talking documentary portrait of this lifelong revel and art-world gadfly."
- Owen Gleiberman from Variety wrote:
  - "The madly teeming pop-cartoon paintings of Robert Cenedella anchor a lively look at a self-styled superstar of outsider art."
- Sheila O'Malley from RogerEbert.com wrote:
  - ""Art Bastard," Victor Kanefsky's Engaging and thought-provoking documentary about Cenedella, is a beautiful portrait of the man himself, still going strong at age 76, as well as a critique of the art world that has ignored him (and others) because they don't "fit.""
- Bob Mondello from NPR wrote:
  - "'Art Bastard' is a film about a man who has tilted – and continues to tilt – at the art-world equivalent of Don Quixote's windmills."
- Stephanie Merry from The Washington Post wrote:
  - "Cenedella is rough around the edges, yet he remains fascinating."
- Frank Scheck from The Hollywood Reporter wrote:
  - "Art Bastard shines brightest not as a biographical portrait – an aim in which it succeeds only sporadically – but rather as a showcase for the highly imaginative and thoughtful works by the now 76-year-old, too-little-known painter."
- Scott Marks from the San Diego Reader wrote:
  - "You may not recognize the name going in, but after spending 82 minutes watching director Victor Kanefsky cast a heartfelt lens in Cenedella's direction, you'll never forget him."
