= Foundation for the Community of Artists =

The Foundation for the Community of Artists was founded in 1971 as a support organization for working artists. By 1988 its membership had grown to nearly 6,000, including artists, art workers and representatives of art organizations. Although the majority lived in the New York metropolitan area, there were members located throughout the US (there was at least one who lived in England). It remained active through the 1990s.

FCA grew out of the National Art Workers Community (a splinter group of the Art Workers' Coalition). From its inception, the organization strove to overcome problems fundamental to the lives of artists. Its initial service was a four-issue-per-year publication, the Art Workers Newsletter, which functioned as an open forum for the exchange of ideas and the dissemination of news items important to the trade. Its name later became Art Workers News and, in the early 1980s, its scope was broadened and it became the bi-monthly publication, Art & Artists. Over the years, articles by leading artists, critics and educators, as well as information relating to health hazards, legal and financial affairs, housing employment and exhibition spaces, appeared in its pages.

== Mission, Services, Accomplishments ==
The Foundation sought to respond to artist needs of the time. Programs included a five-day-a-week hotline to help artists with housing problems in the downtown Manhattan loft community; sponsorship of part of the CETA Artists Project in the late 1970s; Artwork, a job referral and placement agency; and two programs dealing with sexual and racial discrimination.

It offered its members a choice of several group health insurance programs, including Blue Cross/Blue Shield hospitalization/major medical coverage, and a health maintenance/hospitalization plan (HMO) through Healthways, Inc.

In addition to Art & Artists, FCA published a bi-monthly, eight-page newsletter, Artist Update, which listed grants, competitions, resources and other opportunities, and books of particular concern to the working artist, such as the original editions of Dr. Michael McCann’s Health Hazards Manual for Artists and Caryn Leland’s The Art Law Primer.

The Foundation participated in a national consortium of arts groups that focused on issues of living and working space for artists. Computerized lists of available space were kept up to date for the cities of Minneapolis, MN; Washington, DC; Oakland and Berkeley, CA; and New York City.

FCA regularly ran seminars and workshops covering such issues as marketing and publicity, the gallery system, copyright and tax law, art research libraries, “hotline” phone numbers and bulletin boards, art material suppliers, consultants, etc. The organization also helped artists prepare resumes, apply for grants and work out project budgets.

Through the Foundation, members could join the first nationwide credit union for artists of all disciplines. The Artists’ Community Federal Credit Union, as it was called, offered savings accounts, automatic payment of health insurance premiums, financial counseling and personal loans from $100 to $5,000. Members were also eligible to apply for a Working Assets VISA, a “socially responsible” credit card.

Besides these services, the Foundation for the Community of Artists served as an artists' advocacy group. It took an aggressive stand on issues such as resale royalties legislation, the labeling of art materials, artists’ living and working space, and discrimination against minority and women artists. It provided public testimony, studies, publications and press reports through the New York Arts Coalition and the Alliance of New York State Art Councils. In early 1984, FCA helped initiate the cultural campaign Art Against Apartheid, which advocated for the freedom of South Africa. It provided office space and organizational support for AAA's local and national exhibitions and performances. Some of these efforts were documented in Ikon magazine’s Art Against Apartheid: Works for Freedom.

== Funding ==
FCA received funding from the New York State Council on the Arts, the National Endowment for the Arts, and the Manhattan Borough President's Office, via the New York City Department of Cultural Affairs. Membership fees, newspaper subscriptions, the sale of other publications, and the administration of the health plans also generated income. The work of many volunteers along with individual and corporate donations helped keep the organization operational.

== Structure ==
The Foundation's general policies and mode of operation were determined by its self-sustaining Board of Directors, elected once a year, composed primarily of artists. There was a salaried executive director, who was responsible for administration of the policies of the Board and the daily operation of the organization, along with a dedicated office staff.

The Board consisted of a president, several vice-presidents, a secretary, and treasurer. There was also an Advisory Council, which included artists and specialists in areas of expertise appropriate to the Foundation's concerns.

Over the course of its two-decades-long existence, many prominent New Yorkers served in these roles. Executive Directors included Peter Leggieri, David Milne, Melodie Begleiter, Jimmy Durham, Norma Munn and Cynthia Navaretta. They also held positions on the Board.

Other Board and Advisory Council positions were held by, among others, Abe Lubelski, Abu Kodoga, Alex Gross (Vice-President), Alida Walsh, Art Coppedge, Barbara Nessim, Benny Andrews, Bernard Brown (Treasurer/Chair), Betty Chamberlain, Carl Andre, Dan Concholar, Danielle DeMers (Treasurer/Secretary), David Lax, David Troy, Dawoud Bey, Ellen Greenberg, Elliot Barowitz (President/Chairperson), Lori Antonacci (Vice-President, 1984-1987), Gerhardt Liebmann, Hamish Sanderson, Harvey Horowitz, Howard Minsky, Ilene Astrahan, Jacqueline Skiles (Vice-President), Jane Barowitz, Jenny Dixon, John Hazak (Secretary), John Whitman, Jonathan Price, Joseph Farrell, Kenneth S. Freidman, Kerry Matz, Larry Rosing (Chair), Laurin Raiken (President), Louise Despert, Mark Faverman, Dr. Michael McCann, Michele Wallace, Morag Hann, P.V. Bakshi, Pamela Bickart (Treasurer), Peter Frank, Richard Hunt, Robbie McCauley, Robert Perlutter (Vice-President), Robert Volpe, Rosalyn Drexler, Sandy Relis, Stephen Fenichell, Susan Ortega (Vice-President), Tad Crawford, Tamara H. Real, Terry Fox, Virginia Siruses, Walter Weissman (President) and William King.

== Bibliographic citations ==
African Activist Archive, FCA sponsorship of Art Against Apartheid, poster, http://africanactivist.msu.edu/image.php?objectid=32-131-3EA

Allen, Gwen, Artists’ Magazines: An Alternative Space for Art, Cambridge, MA: MIT Press, 2011

Americans for the Arts: Legislation and policy

Bryan-Wilson, Julia, Art Workers: Radical Practice in the Vietnam War Era, University of California Press, 2011

Centers for Disease Control and Prevention, "Epidemiologic Notes and Reports Chromium Sensitization in an Artist's Workshop," MMWR Weekly, Vol. 31, No. 9, March 12, 1982, pp. 111–2, 118 (Dr. Michael McCann's research referenced)

Ellegood, Anne, "Jimmie Durham: At the Center of the World," Hammer Museum, University of California, Los Angeles <https://hammer.ucla.edu/exhibitions/2017/jimmie-durham-at-the-center-of-the-world/>

Edmondson, John and Mitra, Jay, editors, Entrepreneurship and Knowledge Exchange, New York, NY: Taylor & Francis, 2015, Box 3, No. 3 (e-Book)

Franklin Furnace: Archive of the Avant Garde

Glueck, Grace, "Art People, The New York Times, March 25, 1977, p. 69

Gross, Alexander (2009). The untold sixties : when hope was born : an insider's sixties on an international scale. New York: Cross-Cultural Research Projects. p. 647. ISBN 978-0982317808.

Kansas City Art Coalition, KCAC Forum Newsletter, article about Dr. Michael McCann's Health Hazards Manual for Artists, vol. 1, No. 6, September 1975

Kennedy, Shawn G., "For Fledgling Artists, A Place to Grow," The New York Times (national edition, June 18, 1986, p. C00012

Long, Harley, editor, Intermedia magazine, Issue No. 1 "Manifesto," Los Angeles and San Francisco (independent press), 1974

McCann, Michael, "The impact of hazards in art on female workers,"Preventive Medicine, Volume 7, Issue 3, September 1978, New York City, NY: Elsevier, pp. 338–348

Skiles, Jacqueline, “The National Art Workers' Community: Still Struggling,” Art Journal, Volume 34, Issue 4, 1975

Staff Writer, “Boston Artists See End For Real Estate Wars,” The New York Times, August 9, 1987 (Norma Munn, Executive Director of FCA, quoted)

Unnamed author, reprinted from Christian Science Monitor, "Businesses Give Artists a Break — on Goods, Services", Los Angeles Times, May 7, 1989

WorldCat Identities
