= Noguchi Museum =

Biographical art museum in Queens, New York

The Noguchi Museum

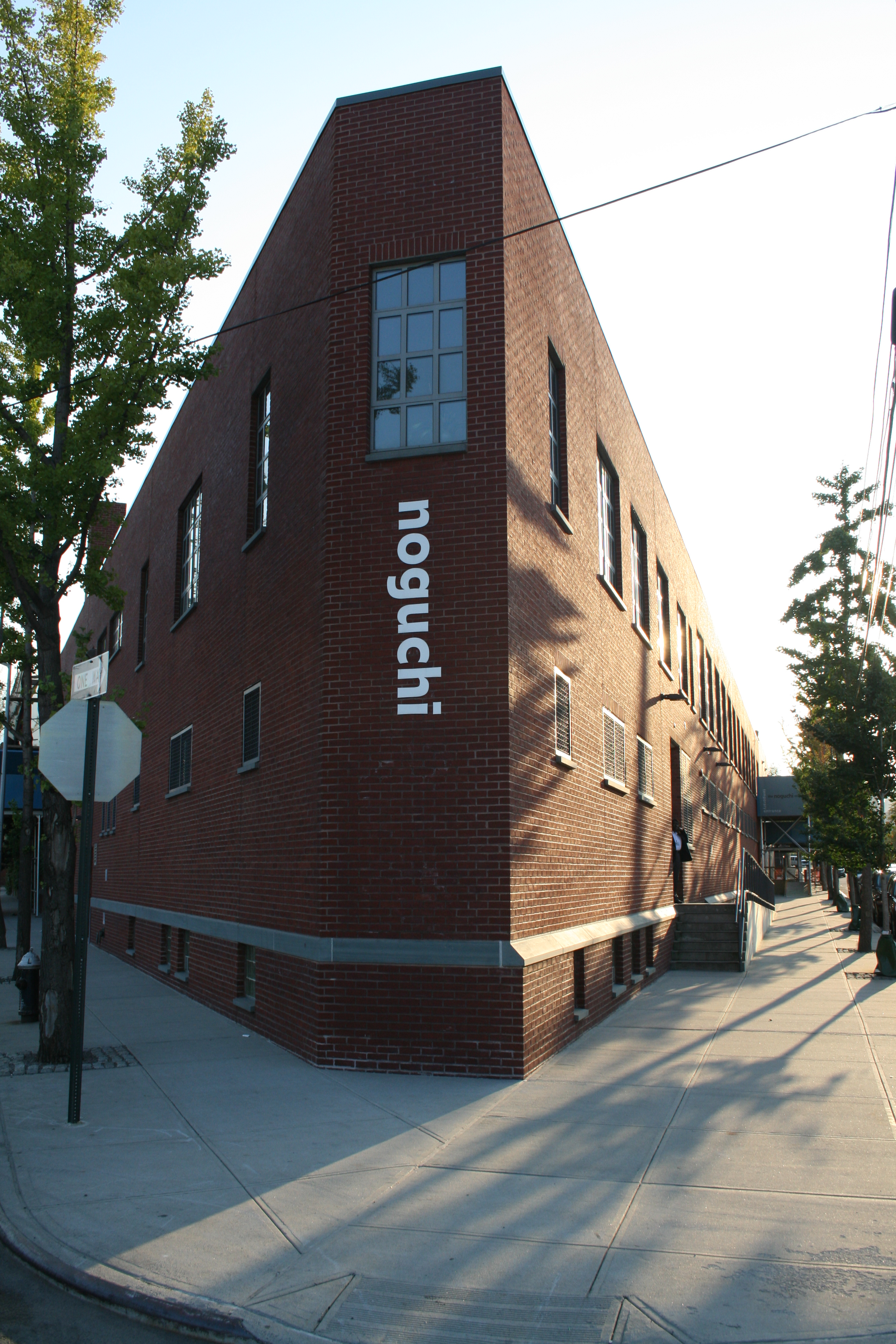
- Established: 1985
- Location: 32-37 Vernon Boulevard, Long Island City, Queens, New York
- Coordinates: 40.766674°N 73.938127°W
- Director: Amy Hau
- Public transit access: New York City Subway: Broadway; MTA Bus: Q104
- Website: noguchi.org

The Noguchi Museum (chartered as The Isamu Noguchi Foundation and Garden Museum) is a museum and sculpture garden at 32-37 Vernon Boulevard in the Long Island City neighborhood of Queens in New York City. Designed and created by the Japanese American sculptor Isamu Noguchi (1904–1988), it opened on a limited basis to the public in 1985. The museum and foundation were intended to preserve and display Noguchi's sculptures, architectural models, stage designs, drawings, and furniture designs. The two-story, 24,000 square feet (2,200 m^{2}) museum and sculpture garden, one block from the Socrates Sculpture Park, underwent major renovations in 2004 allowing the museum to stay open year-round.

== History ==
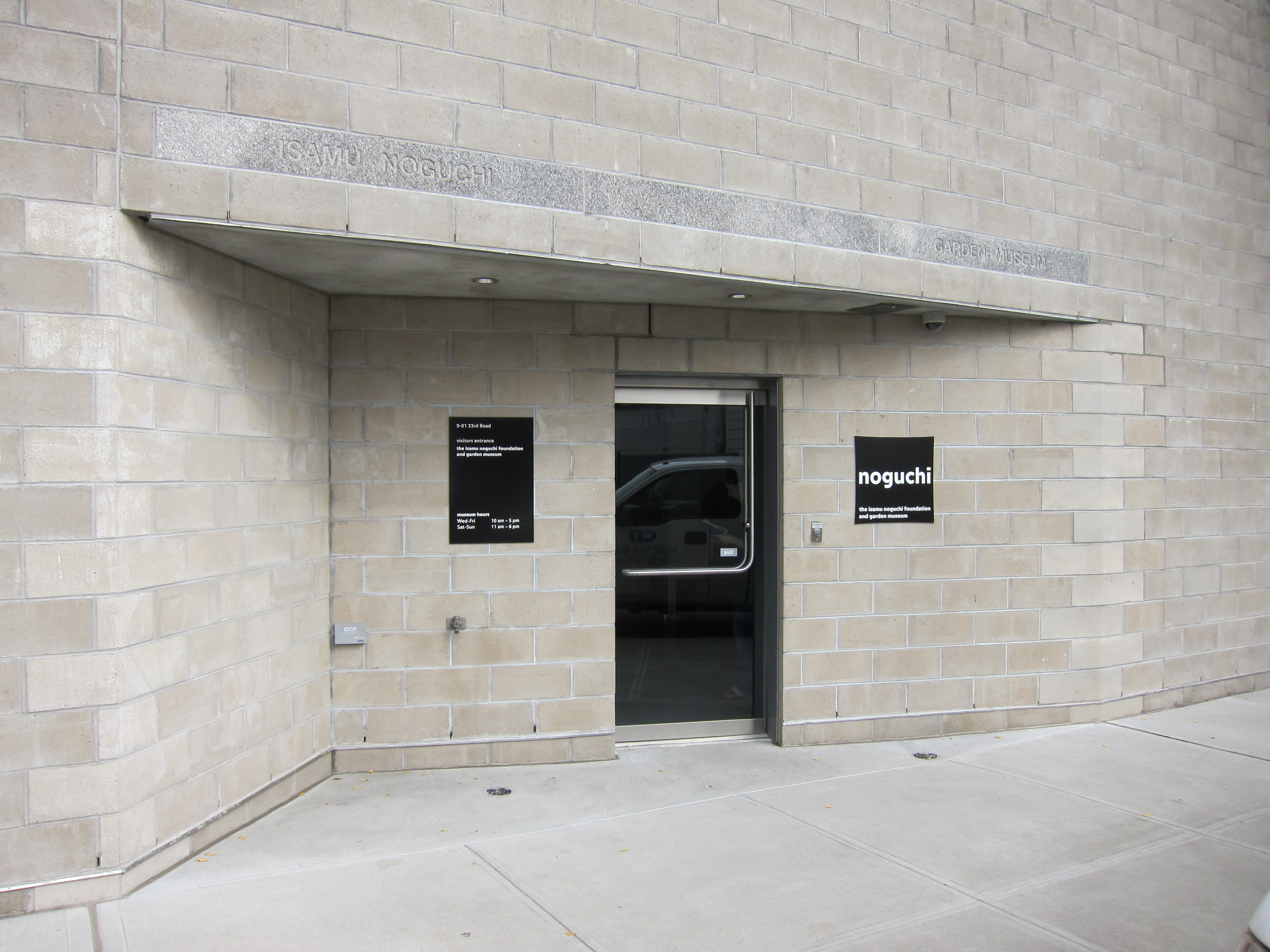
Museum entrance

To house the museum, in 1974 Noguchi purchased a photogravure plant and gas station located across the street from his New York studio, where he had worked and lived since 1961. The Isamu Noguchi Garden Museum opened to the public in 1985 on a seasonal basis. At the time, it was the first such museum to be established by a living artist in America.

In 1999, the Foundation Board approved a $13.5 million capital master plan to address structural concerns, ADA and NYC Building Code compliance and create a new public education facility. During renovation, the museum relocated to a temporary space in Sunnyside, Queens, and held several thematic exhibitions of Noguchi's work. In February 2004, the museum was formally chartered as a museum, and granted 501(c)(3) public charity status. The Noguchi Museum reopened to the public at its newly renovated space in June 2004. The museum building continued to suffer from structural issues into the early 2000s and a second $8 million stabilization project was begun in September 2008. As a result, there are now 12 galleries and a gift shop within the museum.

In 2022, the museum was awarded $4.5 million in capital funding, $1.5 million of which came from Mayor Eric Adams and the rest from Queens Borough president Donovan Richards. The funds will be used for a restoration of the artist's original 1959 living and studio space situated opposite the museum as well as for a new two-story, 6,000-square-foot building adjacent to the studio to house the museum's collection and archival material.

=== Tree of Heaven ===
Until March 26, 2008, a 60-foot (18 m)-tall 75-year-old Tree of Heaven (Ailanthus altissima) was a prominent centerpiece of the sculpture garden at the museum. The tree was spared by Noguchi when in 1975 he bought the building which would become the museum and cleaned up its back lot. "[I]n a sense, the sculpture garden was designed around the tree", said a former aide to Noguchi, Bonnie Rychlak, who later became the museum curator. By early 2008, the tree was found to be dying and threatened to crash into the building, which was about to undergo an $8.2 million renovation. The museum hired the Detroit Tree of Heaven Woodshop, an artists' collective, to use the wood to make benches, sculptures and other amenities in and around the building.

== Programs ==
=== Exhibition ===
The museum celebrated the 25th anniversary of its opening with the exhibition On Becoming an Artist. Isamu Noguchi and His Contemporaries, 1922 – 1960, which open from November 17, 2010, to April 24, 2011

Other artists whose work have been featured include Koho Yamamoto and Toshiko Takaezu.

=== Education ===
The museum's educational program, Art for Families, is a community outreach program aimed at families. The museum also runs a program called Art for Tots for young children.

== Controversy ==
In September 2024, the museum fired three gallery attendants for wearing keffiyeh head scarves, which the museum claimed violated their policy, introduced in August 2024, against employees wearing items that express "political messages, slogans or symbols." Later the same month, author Jhumpa Lahiri declined to accept the museum's annual Isamu Noguchi award, citing the firings as the reason for her refusal.

== Isamu Noguchi Award ==
Since 2014, the Isamu Noguchi Award has been given annually "to individuals who share [museum founder] Noguchi's spirit of innovation, global consciousness, and East-West exchange." Recipients have included:

- 2014: Norman Foster, Hiroshi Sugimoto
- 2015: Jasper Morrison, Yoshio Taniguchi
- 2016: Tadao Ando, Elyn Zimmerman
- 2017: John Pawson, Hiroshi Senju
- 2018: Naoto Fukasawa, Edwina von Gal
- 2019: Rei Kawakubo
- 2020: David Adjaye, Cai Guo-Qiang
- 2021: Shio Kusaka, Toshiko Mori
- 2022: Daniel Brush, Thaddeus Mosley
- 2023: Edmund de Waal, Theaster Gates, Hanya Yanagihara
- 2024: Jhumpa Lahiri (declined on account of the museum firing employees wearing keffiyeh), Lee Ufan

== Directors ==
- 1989–2003: Shoji Sadao
- 2003–2017: Jenny Dixon
- 2018–2023: Brett Littman
- 2024: Amy Hau

== See also ==
- List of museums and cultural institutions in New York City
- List of museums in New York
- List of single-artist museums
- Japanese in New York City
