= Lynette Washington =

American singer

- Origin: New York City
- Genres: Jazz, R&B
- Occupation: Vocalist
- Years active: 1990s – Present
- Label: GuavaJamm

Lynette Washington is an American jazz vocalist. She was the winner in the Jazzmobile Anheuser-Busch Jazz Vocal Competition in 2005.

== Biography ==
Washington is a native New Yorker and has had a career that has taken her across the globe. Her travel has also enabled her to learn to sing in quite a few international languages. Her singing style is heavily rooted in the jazz, R&B, and gospel arenas. Lynette began her early professional singing career performing in Russian nightclubs throughout New York City and Europe. She recorded on the early GRP releases of jazz trumpeter Tom Browne as well with her own R&B/Dance group Touché on Emergency Records.

She has worked with artists such as Aretha Franklin, U2, and Peter Gabriel and featured lead singer in New Voices of Freedom appearing in U2's Rattle & Hum, BBC's One World, One Voice, and Lenny Kravitz's "Give Peace A Chance" on Virgin Records. Lynette has also recorded radio commercials and appeared in national TV commercials for Roy Rogers, Mercedes Benz, Boy’s Town, Nescafe and Pizza Hut. She has appeared with such jazz notables as drummers Buddy Williams & Anton Fig, saxophonists Clifford Jordan & Gerry Niewood and bassists Alex Blake and Cameron Brown.

Her New York City club appearances include Creole, The River Room, Sweet Rhythm, Azalea, Opa, The Lenox Lounge, and others. In 1999, Lynette completed her first solo project entitled Long, Long Ago (A Jazz Celebration of Christmas, Chanukah and Kwanzaa (1999)) featuring Chuck Mangione's reedman Gerry Niewood. Her second solo project, Smoky Dawn was in 2003, and she also joined forces with her Gold/Platinum Award winning producer, pianist Dennis Bell to release a double CD LIVE! at Harlem's Kennedy Center.

== Selective discography ==
Year	Title	Genre	Label
1999	Long, Long Ago (A Jazz Celebration of Christmas, Chanukah & Kwanza)	Jazz Gospel	GuavaJamm
2003	LIVE! At Harlem's Kennedy Center	Jazz	GuavaJamm
2003	Smoky Dawn	Jazz	GuavaJamm
2010	Kaleidoscope	Jazz	GuavaJamm
