= Herman Cherry =

American painter

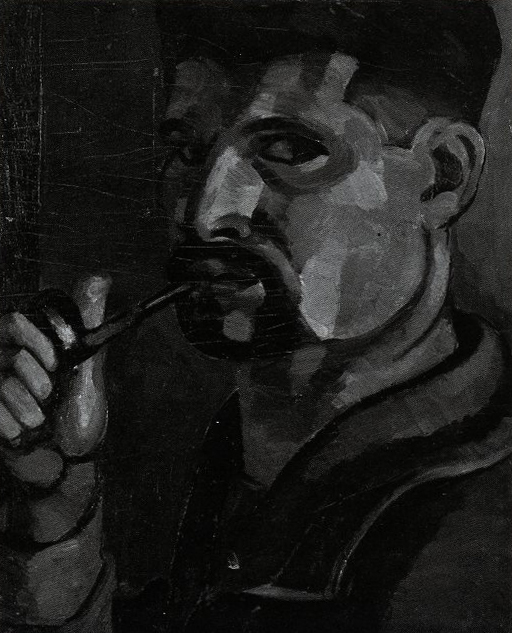
- Herman Cherry, Self Portrait, 1927, oil on canvas, 15 x 12 inches
- Born: Hyman Cherry; April 10, 1909; Atlantic City, New Jersey
- Died: April 10, 1992 (aged 83); Manhattan, New York
- Spouse(s): Ruby ("Denny") Sonke Cherry, Regina Kremer Cherry

Herman Cherry (1909–1992) was a non-objective abstract painter who participated in all five of the artist-curated Stable Gallery exhibitions in Manhattan between 1953 and 1957 and who received his first New York solo exhibition at Stable in 1955. In the early 1930s, he was a student first of the synchromist painter Stanton Macdonald-Wright at the Art Students League of Los Angeles and next of the regionalist painter Thomas Hart Benton at the Art Students League of New York. Afterward, Cherry managed a small gallery within a Hollywood bookshop where he gave Philip Guston his first exhibition and where his own first solo was later held. Having transitioned from social realism to cubist-inspired abstraction in the 1940s, Cherry joined with the artists who later became collectively known as the New York School in establishing a style that later became known as Abstract expressionism. Key members of this group were Cherry's friends Franz Kline and Willem de Kooning.

Cherry's mature works were entirely abstract. Known as a masterful colorist, he often received favorable attention from critics and art historians. In 1984, the art historian Helen A. Harrison wrote: "At a time when many artists seem to be angered by paint itself, using it crudely and with little apparent regard for its inherent beauty, Cherry comes off as something of a romantic. His evident enchantment with the medium is expressed in terms of tonal relationships. His colors become characters that act out roles relative to each other, according to their own scenario—sometimes dramatic, sometimes mysterious, occasionally even humorous—as directed by the master's hand. And that direction is as respectful of each color's individuality as it is sensitive to the results of their confrontations and interactions."

During a career that spanned nearly six decades, Cherry's work appeared frequently in solo and group exhibitions within commercial galleries, museums, and the galleries of artists' collectives. Throughout his career, he was active in artists' associations, gave lectures on art, taught art as a visiting professor, wrote articles for art journals, and produced a book of poetry. Born in New Jersey to parents who had emigrated from Eastern Europe, he grew up in Philadelphia and Los Angeles and later spent much of his adult life in Manhattan, Woodstock, and East Hampton, New York.

== Early life and training ==
Cherry was born in Atlantic City, New Jersey, and raised in Philadelphia, Pennsylvania. Late in life, he told an interviewer that his parents opposed his childhood interest in art. Nonetheless, when he was twelve, he began taking free art classes at Philadelphia's Graphic Sketch Club. Three years later, then living in Los Angeles, he dropped out of high school and found work as a set designer for the 20th Century Fox film studio. In 1927, a small compensation he received as victim of an automobile accident enabled him to enroll as a night student at the Otis Art Institute. A scholarship and employment as a school monitor enabled him to continue studying for two years. Cherry later credited one of his Otis teachers, the synchromist artist, Stanton Macdonald-Wright, with his understanding of color. He said: "It wasn’t that he taught me color. He made me see color.” Leaving Los Angeles, he knocked around California as an itinerant laborer and then became a cook's helper on a cargo ship destined for Northern European ports. Having jumped ship in Poland, he spent part of the year 1930 looking at paintings in German museums and galleries and then found work on another ship bound for Savannah, Georgia. While studying with Macdonald-Wright, Cherry had come across an article about Thomas Hart Benton that intrigued him, and so, after landing in Savannah, he hitchhiked to Manhattan to take classes at the Art Students League where Benton was then teaching. In 1931, Benton took him on as an assistant as he began work on Benton's well-known America Today mural for The New School for Social Research.

== Career in art ==
In the fall of 1931, Cherry returned to Los Angeles where, for the next few years, he ran a gallery in a disused room at the back of a Hollywood bookshop owned by Stanley Rose. Known first as the Younger Painters' Gallery and later as the Stanley Rose Gallery, it was informally known as the "back room", and it also served as an informal avant-garde cultural center. In 1933, Cherry gave Philip Guston the first exhibition of his career in the Stanley Rose Gallery. When, in 1934, he gave himself his first solo exhibition at the gallery, a critic for the Los Angeles Times said his drawings had "the beauty of clarity in line and form" and said a self-portrait (shown in the infobox, above) was "strong like wood sculpture and fine in color". Cherry later said that during the three years he ran the gallery he could not recall making a single sale.

In 1937, Cherry joined the Federal Art Project. Reporting to the California director of the project, MacDonald-Wright, he worked first in Santa Barbara and later in Los Angeles, where he did little work of his own, but helped Gordon Grant, Lorser Feitelson, and MacDonald-Wright in making murals. Cherry later told an interviewer that working on the project "was like winning a lottery for ten million dollars. ... We couldn’t believe that you got paid twenty-three dollars a week, just to paint. It was the craziest thing we ever heard of."

In the late 1930s, Cherry's paintings appeared in group shows on the West Coast along with work by a woman named Denny Winters. When she and he showed together at the Stanley Rose Gallery in 1939, a reviewer for the Los Angeles Times said her paintings showed "endless drama" in her "large, dynamic landscapes" and described Cherry's work as more "concerned with design and pigment," adding, "he knows how to intensify form with deeply glowing color." Their duo show was one of the last held in the Rose Gallery which closed later that year. Also later in the same year, the two of them married and began a collaboration that extended for the next decade.

One of the group shows in which Cherry and Winters showed paintings was mounted in 1938 in the gallery run by the Los Angeles chapter of a radical artists' collective called the American Artists' Congress. A year later, when the American Artists' Congress gave him a solo exhibition, a reviewer praised his "Portrait of a Poet" and described a gruesome painting showing a corpse hanging on a barbed wire barrier.

Cherry's appearance in a group exhibition at the Borden Gallery in Los Angeles in 1939 drew a favorable review in the Los Angeles Times. The critic said he made "color sing beautifully and originally" in one particularly "remarkable abstract piece". Early in 1941, Cherry and Winters designed sets for Duke Ellington's Jump for Joy revue, and later that year, the En's Gallery in Los Angeles gave him a solo exhibition of small paintings and other works. In 1943, he won an award for a painting called "Mickey" (a cat) at the annual exhibition held by the Los Angeles County Museum and in 1945 he was given a solo exhibition at the George Castine Gallery in that city. Reviewing the latter, a critic praised his handling of color and said his paintings came "from a brush that knows what it is doing". A review in the Los Angeles Times said his paintings were "beautiful in color" and had "sound pictorial construction and enlivening rhythmical schemes." Its reviewer also noted that the show produced quite a few sales.

In the summer months of 1945, Cherry and Denny moved to the artist colony in Woodstock, New York. Cherry joined the Woodstock Artists Association and was soon elected to be one of its directors. In 1947 and 1948, Cherry directed the first of two national art conferences held by the association. That year, he also received his first solo exhibition in a Manhattan commercial gallery. This show, at the Weyhe Gallery, drew favorable reviews in the New York press, including one from Edward Alden Jewell of the New York Times praising the wit and inventiveness of some mobiles and stabiles that Cherry called pictographs. Another reviewer said "here there is no great art form, but an unpretentious, original laughter", and a third said they were "all very clever, very gay, and, of course, very sophisticated. In a photo spread from the show, a reporter for Life magazine noted that most of the mobiles had been sold and quoted Cherry as saying he made them simply for fun. A second solo followed at Weyhe in 1948.

In the fall of that year, Cherry and Winters sailed for France on a trip funded by a Guggenheim Fellowship she had won. She returned the following year while Cherry remained abroad. During the rest of 1949, he visited southern France and Italy, taking photographic color slides and gathering material for lectures he planned to give on his return to the US. While in France, he met Henri Breuil, the archaeologist who controlled access to the Lascaux Caves and subsequently became one of the first Americans to observe the prehistoric paintings they contained. After his return, he spent part of 1951 traveling in South America for the same purpose.

Based for a time in Manhattan and having recently divorced from Winters, he developed friendships with Willem de Kooning, Franz Klein, Philip Guston, and other artists. He gathered with them at the Cedar Tavern and was inducted into the club that that group had formed to discuss cultural topics. Many members of the group were, as a critic later reported, "straining to arrive at a new, emotive abstraction". The labels "abstract expressionist" and "New York School" would later be applied to these artists. Cherry did not participate in the first of the artist-sponsored shows held by the group in a vacant store on East 9th Street in Manhattan in 1951, but he helped organize and participated in all five of the Stable Gallery shows that they put on between 1953 and 1957. The catalog for the 1953 show included a statement by Clement Greenberg saying the artworks were transitional, "not yet pinned down and fixed by the verdicts of critics, or museums, or 'safe' collectors." Reviewing the following year's show, a critic for Art Digest said a painting of Cherry's was "very well painted and full of romantic mystery." In 1955, Cherry was given a solo exhibition at the Stable Gallery which a reviewer described as containing "night world paintings" that revealed "his efforts to fuse color and form into a single unit."

During the second half of the 1950s, Cherry took color photographs in New York galleries for a color transparency production company called Contemporary Slides. In 1990, an art critic wrote: "If you needed a slide of a work by a member of the New York School (a term not then in use), you didn't proceed to the Metropolitan Museum, which, despite the size of its wide collection, had no de Kooning, Pollock, or Rothko in stock, rather, you called Contemporary Slides".

Cherry was given solo exhibitions at the Tanager Gallery in 1958 and the Poindexter Gallery the following year. Both garnered favorable reviews in Art News, the latter claiming that he was at that time "an art world live wire". A second Poindexter solo in 1961 received another favorable Art News review.

By this time, Cherry was spending a good part of his work life teaching art as a visiting professor in US colleges and universities, and many of the solo and group exhibitions in which he participated were consequently held outside New York. While he was serving as an artist-in-residence at the University of Kentucky, Cherry was given a solo exhibition of recent paintings in the school's art gallery. Writing in a local paper, a reviewer said the pictures contained "bold and joyous forms". The same reviewer noted that Cherry's work was "widely represented in important private and public collections."

In 1970, having spent the summer months of the previous few years in rentals, Cherry bought a small house and some land in East Hampton on Long Island, New York.

In 1978-79, Cherry worked in a program funded by the Comprehensive Employment and Training Act. During this time, he made murals throughout New York City.

In 1983, the Grason Gallery in Chicago gave Cherry his first retrospective exhibition. Covering a period of 25 years, from his last solos in New York commercial galleries up to the present, the show demonstrated, in the words of one reviewer, his "high level of achievement" during a period when he was spending more of his time teaching than painting. A year later, the American Academy of Arts and Letters gave Cherry its Award in Art. Later that year, a solo exhibition in an East Hampton gallery drew forth an admiring review in Art in America. Later yet, in reviewing a solo at the Luise Ross Gallery, Helen A. Harrison, gave Cherry's paintings the most extensive and detailed consideration they had until then received. She wrote: "Cherry has often been characterized as a 'painter's painter,' a term which, it seems to me, implies that ordinary mortals will neither like nor understand what he is up to. It does him no disservice to acknowledge that, over the years, his most appreciative audience has been his fellow artists, partly because only a colleague would be fully aware of the intensity of his struggle with the purest problems of painting. That he has now succeeded in resolving many of those issues in a manner that expands our consciousness of paint's possibilities, while appealing directly to the senses, belies any danger that he will remain of interest only to the specialist."

From 1988 to 1993, Cherry was represented by the Luise Ross Gallery in New York.

In 1989, when the Ball State University Art Gallery gave Cherry a retrospective exhibition of 60 works dating from the 1930s, the critical response was both extensive and entirely favorable. A reviewer from a local paper said that Cherry, then 80 years old, was currently making paintings that were "stronger than ever" and described his earlier work as, variously, "dark and delving" or having "all-encompassing brilliance". Lawrence Campbell, writing in Art in America, said that in the paintings of this exhibit, "colors mysteriously come and go" and he quoted Cherry's comment that to him the paintings had, "resonance from the depth of the canvas to the open sky." At this time, Newsday sent a reporter to interview him at his East Hampton home. When the reporter asked him about the extensive recent attention given him, he said he had been unable to make a living from art sales until he was in his 70s, adding: "I don't understand why I'm having these shows. I'm a little surprised. Not that I don't deserve it, but why now?" Looking back on the days when he and the other abstract expressionists would gather to drink and discuss their work, he said, "It was a very enlightening period for me. I had never met artists such as these, that were intelligent, belligerent and didn't give a damn about success or money."

Cherry's other solo exhibitions of 1989 included appearances at the Anita Shapolsky Gallery and the Luise Ross Gallery in Manhattan, as well as the Baruch College art gallery and the art gallery of the State University at Stony Brook on Long Island.

In reviewing the Stony Brook exhibition, Helen A. Harrison discussed Cherry's career from the time he became, as she said, "deeply involved in what amounted to a reinvention of painting in the post-World War II years" and she went on to describe his recent work as having "shimmering layers of tone [that] no longer move along a flat, one-dimensional plane, but now shift into relief, advancing and receding as and drifting ice is echoed in the implicit movement that many of his paintings suggest." She concluded, "Mr. Cherry is a master of luminosity, calling forth a glow that seems to emanate from within the canvases themselves."

A remarkable quality was his persistent optimism and devotion to painting and art. He worked endlessly during his last years, maintaining all his faculties in the face of a chronic, debilitating illness. His impish idealism and innocence was always attractive to those who met him for the first time as well as to those who knew and loved him for years. He was truly a most unforgettable character and a man of remarkable personal integrity.— Submitted to the AskArt database of artist biographies by Robert S. April, MD, a friend of Cherry's.

Early in 1992. Cherry participated in a solo exhibition at the Luise Ross Gallery. He died at home in his studio on Mercer Street a few months later, on April 10, 1992. Weakened by a heart attack in 1975, his death resulted from a combination of heart and liver disease. Over the next decade, his work continued to be shown in New York. The Gary Snyder Fine Art Gallery produced a solo in 2002 and a three-artist show the following year. In 2004, a college of Long Island University mounted a solo and Findlay showed his work again in solos over the next three years. To celebrate the 100th anniversary of his birth, Findlay presented a retrospective and in 2009 put on what proved to be the last of its presentations of his art.

Throughout his career, Cherry participated in many group exhibitions, beginning in 1931 with a show he staged at the Stanley Rose Gallery in Los Angeles, including five of the Whitney Museum's annual exhibitions of contemporary American art between 1948 and 1957. He participated regularly in exhibitions held by the Woodstock Artists Association and other nonprofit organizations as well as commercial galleries and museums across the nation.

== Style and technique ==
(1) Herman Cherry, Dogma, 1945, tempera, 20 3/4 x 24 1/4 inches

(2) Herman Cherry, Still Life, 1951, oil and ink on canvas, 42 x 28 inches

(3) Herman Cherry, Cave of Black 1954, oil on canvas with other materials, 61 x 54 inches

(4) Herman Cherry, No. 4, 1954, oil on canvas, 56 1/2 x 53 inches

(5) Herman Cherry, Intrusion, 1963, monotype, 60 x 50 1/8 inches

(6) Herman Cherry, Cutoff, 1982, oil on canvas, 43 x 32 inches

(7) Herman Cherry, Ukiyo-e, 1984, oil on canvas

(8) Herman Cherry, Alien Light, 1985, oil on canvas, 32 x 28 inches

[T]he possibility of failure is always present. And along with it, the possibility of success. I mean, that's the hope... It's also a pain in the ass, because it puts you in a continual off-balance with your life... and at the same time that it bothers you, it's the one thing that holds you to it.— Herman Cherry, Oral History Interview (1985, Archives of American Art)

Cherry's earliest paintings were figurative and were seen to have been inspired by European traditions. One critic described Cherry's 1927 self portrait (shown in the infobox, above) as "decidedly French-inspired, a clumsy Cezanne card player with a strong hand cradling his pipe. His paintings of the 1930s were figurative in the then-prevalent American Scene style. Before transitioning from figurative to abstract painting, he found his first commercial success in making objects that he called pictographs. These were mobiles and stabiles made from small found objects such as wire, rope, chains, and fragments of glass. A critic who had followed Cherry's career closely, suggested that he gave up making these constructions and returned to painting largely because he felt they attracted the wrong kind of attention. He wanted to be taken seriously and not as a maker of witty and light-hearted conversation pieces. During an oral history interview in 1965, Cherry spoke about his subsequent transition to abstraction. On moving to Manhattan in the late 1940s, he befriended Kline, de Kooning, and the other artists who were struggling to develop a new approach to painting. Regarding the importance of his participation in their explorations, he later said, "I think it's very rare that someone working alone comes up with something which is way in advance of his time... Generally it's a group action of some kind". His lithograph called "Dogma" (Image No. 1), made in the late 1940s, is one of his first works in the new style he was then developing.

In an artist's statement that Cherry contributed to the catalog of the 1953 Stable Gallery exhibition, he discussed the difficulty of achieving abstraction in painting and said that in applying color he imagined it could both occupy its own emotional space and support a painting's structure. Colors, he said, were "the bones of the paint." In discussing a painting called "Cave of Black" (Image No. 2), a critic for Art in America called attention to a pictorial structure that was "achieved through the lively interaction" of color shapes and said the painting evoked "sensual pleasure in the physicality of the materials."

Cherry also spoke of colors engaging with and repelling from each other, being sympathetic or antagonistic and evoking feelings of pleasure or disgust. One critic saw in the paintings he exhibited in the 1955 solo at the Stable Gallery "a wealth of color and imagery shining forth." Reviewing the 1959 solo at Poindexter, a critic said Cherry had become a "sure colorist" who "pushes apart colors that the eye tries to draw together". Another said of the paintings shown in the 1961 solo at Poindexter: "By operating his colors against one another, he can make a canvas dance." This critic believed that Cherry's main concern, however, was "not with color itself, but with energy: sun energy, kinetic energy, hand energy, and spirit energy." Cherry had said something like this in his 1955 essay, writing, simply, "Color is its own light." In reviewing the 2004 retrospective show at Southampton College, a reviewer felt that Cherry's paintings conveyed "a sense of movement and shifting depth through subtle optical and atmospheric effects". Yet another critic wrote that the paintings of this period comprised a "kinetic record of changing modes of feeling." Elaborating on the concept of motion generated by color forms, a critic reviewing a four-man show at a Woodstock gallery wrote in 1964, "Mr. Cherry's approach to inventing intensely gripping surfaces depends on establishing an emphatic architectonic structure, allowing the motion to be within a controlled but vibrant area." Cherry's painting called "No. 4" of 1958 (Image No. 3) was shown at this time.

Cherry's style changed little between the years of his New York solo exhibitions in the 1950s and 1960s and the years of the 1970s during which he traveled frequently and the 1980s when he lived quietly in East Hampton. Reviewing his solo at Luise Ross in 1982, a critic said his current style was a synthesis achieved after many years of experimentation. Writing that "his hues have the lusciousness of velvet", the critic went on to say that some of the paintings in the show demonstrated an aesthetic maturity and technical mastery "at their peak". In 1989, Helen A. Harrison echoed these comments. She wrote that in this period he had developed and refined "a luminous approach to color that gives his canvases a characteristically sensuous, vibrant quality." Maintaining that in his paintings Cherry built up "layers of tone and texture with unerring skill and sensitivity", she discussed a synthesis in which his handling of color set up "a low-key vibrancy that makes [the paintings] appear almost electrically charged." Cherry's painting, Cutoff (Image No. 6) was shown at this time.

In 1989, Helen A. Harrison described Cherry's painting, Alien Light (Image No. 7), as luminous, "calling forth a glow that seems to emanate from within". She said his painting called Ukiyo-e (Image No. 8) stimulated the mind and senses at the same time. She wrote: "Its central field of shadowy grays shimmers like a dark cloud passing across a pool, while linear elements hover over the surface. Patches of brilliant color intrude at the edges, brightening the introspective mood and providing chromatic variety. As the title implies, this is a floating world, one in which shape and tone, as well as line and plane, exist in harmonious balance."

Cherry first made experimental monotype prints in the 1960s. A monotype called Intrusion of 1963 is shown here, Image No. 5. Although these hand printed works were in the same style as his paintings, critics found them to be freer and less tightly controlled. One said they had a "a pleasant, light, and airy feeling" and another said their "lively formal improvisation and gestural spontaneity" showed an uninhibited point of view.

In 1965, Cherry told an interviewer that artists should not be overly concerned about technique. He felt that too much focus on the mechanics of painting kept the artist from realizing the "expressive force" of a painting. In responding to an interview question on this subject, he said, "the artist is basically trying to reach some point where he can say best what he has to say. And all he wants from a medium is for it not to get in his way. That's all. And he certainly doesn't want to be self-conscious about it." A few years later, he told another interviewer why he continued to paint in oil even after acrylics became popular. "In my painting", he said, "I still use oil. I'm very old-fashioned in that sense. The new plastic paints work for the kind of art they're doing now. I understand the attitude—it dries quickly. The artists want to finish. their product in a hurry. Oil paint is like Nature. It's not geared to the 20th century. Nature is accidental." While he was working out of a studio he mainly painted on canvas and when he was traveling, as during the long period when he moved around the country teaching as a visiting professor, he mainly painted on paper.

Some of his paintings on canvas contained areas of heavily layered pigment adjacent to thinly painted ones. They also sometimes contained areas of impasto and occasionally foreign matter such as coffee grounds.

He said his approach to painting was undisciplined. He would select a theme for a group of paintings without much conscious deliberation and then make as many as 100 paintings using that single inspiration. When he felt he had exhausted its possibilities, he might prepare a single large work before dropping the theme and moving on.

== Art teacher ==
In the 1930s and 1940s, while living in Los Angeles, Cherry taught private evening classes in his studio. By 1961, when he was given the second of his two Poindexter solos, interest in abstract expressionism had peaked among critics and collectors and the era of pop art and minimalism had begun. With gallerists no longer interested in showing his paintings, he relied increasingly on his work as a college and university visiting instructor to earn his living.

These are some of the positions he held during that time. Except as noted, this list is taken from The New York School; a Cultural Reckoning by Dore Ashton (1973, Viking Press, New York).

- 1957 University of Mississippi
- 1958 Southern Illinois University, Carbondale
- 1958-1959 University of California, Berkeley
- 1965 University of California, Berkeley
- 1966 University of Kentucky
- 1968-1970 Southampton College, Southampton, New York
- 1970-74 Kingsborough Community College, New York
- 1974 Parsons School of Design, New York
- 1974 New York Studio School
- 1981 University of Minnesota
- 1981 New York Studio School
- 1984 New York Studio School
- 1988 Pratt Institute, New York

Cherry also gave many lectures. During the 1950s and 1960s, he gave informal talks or slide presentations in such places as Woodstock, New York; Iowa State University, Ames; Bard College, Annandale-on-Hudson; and the University of California, Los Angeles.

== Art writer ==
The art critic and journalist Judd Tully, who knew him well, wrote that Cherry might have earned his living as a writer if he chose to do so.

In 1940, Cherry wrote an unusual book devoted to modern French art called Scrapbook of Art. Intended to be the first of a series, it contained articles on sixteen French artists of the modern period with a representative work from each of them. Produced in an eleven by fourteen inch album format, it contained blank pages facing the text pages and gave instructions for readers to paste their own art reproductions in the space provided. The publisher reported that poor sales forced the cancellation of the series after the first number.

In 1951, Cherry contributed an essay to a book containing artists' writings (The Art of the Artist compiled by Arthur Azidenberg, 1951, Crown Publishers, New York). Taking as his subject "The State of Painting", he criticized artists whose work he saw as "shiny, brassy, finished and framed" and celebrated the "searching painter" who worked in "terrifying loneliness" to produce "maverick work". He said the "mercurial experimentation" of contemporary artists was being encouraged by the new practice of bringing working artists into academic art departments to help students work out the contemporary problems that beset them.

In 1954, he wrote articles for the August 1st and November 15 issues of Art Digest, In the first, called "Woodstock; Paradise Lost", he objected to the gentrification of the artist colony in that community. Complaining that many artists lived "pleasant lives in lovely houses, surrounded by patrons who wallow in sugar-coated bohemianism," he said that the local galleries catered to a public that knew little about art. Nonetheless, he praised the community's generosity in supporting impoverished artists and its energetic sponsorship of festivals, conferences, and lectures.

The second article was a review of a solo exhibition of Seymour Lipton's sculpture at the Betty Parson's Gallery in New York. Cherry said Lipton's work "speaks of interior form, as the pith of a tree, the sap, the backbone of a man; it speaks of internal tension... [and is] centrifugal,.. broken from the bounds of the base, soaring from within, and glittering with refracted light".

In 1956, Art Digest and Craft Horizons published articles he had written. Called "Los Angeles Revisited", the first of the two was an illustrated discussion of art and artists in that city. He saw a great deal of activity but suggested this evidence of collectors' passion might be no more than "a new form of therapy stimulated by the enormous influx of psychiatrists for the Hollywood loot". He explained that many Hollywood film moguls had turned to art as therapy and begun taking instruction from the city's artists. However, "the biggest factor on the artistic scene in Los Angeles today," he said, "remains the peculiar mixture of provincialism and sophistication which dominates everything. Mature attitudes and mature work exist side by side with fantastic ignorance." "A strong sense of cultural inferiority," he wrote, has "transformed into a form of aggressive chauvinism". Nonetheless, he saw hope in the emergence of a few private gallerists who were in contact with the New York art scene and of a few academic art departments, such as the one at the University of California, Los Angeles, where artist-instructors were "enthusiastic in their work" and carrying on with their art work while holding down teaching positions.

The article he wrote for Craft Horizons concerned the abstract artist Joseph Meert, who was then exhibiting abstract works in stained glass at the Stable Gallery. Cherry described the challenges that the artist faced and the experimental techniques he used to achieve improvisational results. He concluded with this statement: "To Joseph Meert, one basic difference between painting and stained glass is an irreconcilable one. He believes that stained glass has only half a life without architectural anchorage, whereas painting has a life of its own and can live anywhere. The need for painters in the past for a wall to paint on has its modern equivalent for stained glass designers—a building to work with."

In 1957, Cherry wrote a satirical review of Selden Rodman's book, Conversations with Painters (1957, Devin-Adair, New York). In it, he imitated Rodman's prose style while condemning the author's distortion of facts and ignorance of contemporary art and artists. In one section, he discussed "wild statements" that the author made about Willem de Kooning, saying they comprised "a neat little package of distortion and willful romanticism and the cheapest type of purple journalese writing."

In 1958, Cherry and Elmer Bischoff wrote a letter to the editor of Art Digest criticizing the director of the Portland Art Museum for unilaterally removing a painting that Cherry and Bischoff, as judges, had selected to appear. They said the director's action "implied a lack of aesthetic judgment and integrity on our part" and made a mockery of the jury system of selecting art for exhibition.

In 1959, Cherry joined seven other artists in answering the question, "Is there a new academy?". Writing in the summer issue of Art News, the group, which included Helen Frankenthaler, Ad Reinhardt, and Elaine de Kooning, took on the controversial assertion that a New York School had emerged from the artist-sponsored exhibitions of the 9th Street Gallery and the Stable Gallery in the early years of the decade. Cherry denied that a new academy existed or could exist in the current environment of fast-moving experimentation. He wrote, "Painting being what it is today—subjective—makes it difficult for a formula, based on convention and manners, to assert itself. The continual crisis and its partial resolution—the destruction and the rebuilding—mark the creative restlessness of twentieth-century man; his inherent inability to accept the attitudes of his grandfathers."

In 1968, Cherry published a review in Art News of a solo by artist and art teacher Warren Brandt at New York's Sachs Gallery. In it, he said Brandt's paintings came perilously close to illustration but that Brandt had loosed up sufficiently to permit chance effects to enter his work. Cherry wrote, "In earlier work [Brandt] was able to pull out of a difficult situation by depending on his abilities as a draftsman. His new work is constructed by color. He cuts through objects and space, letting them become one. He destroys the literal plane and forces the color to assume both space and object. More and more his work tends towards the abstraction that is so absorbing in a Matisse. It is a real abstraction because it comes out of things and is an invention."

In 1976, Cherry published a book entitled Poems of Pain—and Other Matters (UNA Editions, New York). Along with Cherry's poetry, it contained drawings by the abstract expressionist artist, Alcopley.

In 1990, Cherry wrote a statement for a retrospective exhibition of work by Reuben Kadish held at the New Jersey State Museum. Discussing Kadish's terracotta sculptures, Cherry wrote, "I have watched Reuben’s seeing, thinking fingers probing for the right form... His blunt capable fingers make the clay writhe with spontaneous life. Kadish’s need and love of the earth are not unlike that of the Greek god Antaeus—son of Gaea, the earth mother—who became stronger each time he embraced the earth."

== Personal life and family ==
Cherry was born on April 10, 1909, in Atlantic City, New Jersey. His name at birth was Hyman Cherry. His 1940 draft registration recorded his name as Herman Joseph Cherry and his 1940 marriage certificate showed it as Herman J. Cherry. Cherry's father was a tailor of women's garments, born in Fastiv, Ukraine, then part of the Russian Empire. His father's original surname was Cherkovski or Cherkovsky. An immigration record of 1902 in the National Archives and Records Administration gives his surname name as Czerkasky. Official records after that date, including his 1919 naturalization record, list him as Israel Cherry. He had immigrated to the US in 1902 and a few years later married Cherry's mother, Rose Rotkowitz, who had immigrated in 1905.

Cherry had an older sister, Mary, and a younger brother, Samuel. He grew up in Philadelphia and, in 1923, aged 15, was brought to Los Angeles where, as things turned out, his father's business failed to prosper. With his family short of money and finding in himself little motivation to study, he soon dropped out of high school and found work first as a migrant laborer and subsequently as a newsboy in Hollywood. Later, while taking night classes at Otis, he worked on set designs for 20th Century Fox and sometimes appeared as an extra in the cowboy movies of the time. He took his first trip to Europe in 1929, working on a Norwegian freighter as a cook's helper and, having jumped ship in Poland, remained stranded with no passport until, now aged 19, he was able to return to the US on another ship.

Having returned to Los Angeles after studying art in New York, he spent the early 1930s working in the Rose Gallery and the later 1930s in the Federal Art Project. He married his companion of this period, Denny Winters, in 1939. After he returned to New York in 1945, that state became his home base for the rest of his life. In 1950, he and Winters divorced. She moved to Rockport, Maine, and, sometime later, he began to split his time between Manhattan and East Hampton. While traveling in Europe in 1975, he met a young painter, Regina Kremer, and married her the following year.

Kremer later suggested that Cherry's personality limited his ability to show and sell his paintings during some periods of his career. She said an independent spirit kept him from socializing comfortably with gallerists and collectors and made him seem to have an abrasive personality. She said this trait was most evident during the years between 1950 when he divorced Winters, and 1976 when he married her. In 1989, he told an interviewer that when gallery owners stopped calling him, he would "of course" not stoop to calling them.

In 1951, Cherry wrote that he considered himself to be living in an "age of slickness", by which he meant a time where all that was "shiny, brassy, finished, and framed" was pushed on the public via "high pressure art publicity" to the detriment of the "maverick work of the searching painter" who courageously opened himself to the possibility of failure. He gave a lecture in 1959 in which he aired other grievances. He said that artists were exploited by landlords when they created studio apartments in commercial lofts and that the people who came to see their work, could not "understand a painter's struggling and suffering for the need and the right to try and to fail."

=== Progressive politics ===
Cherry participated in radical organizations without taking a leadership role in them. During the late 1930s, he was a member of the Communist-sponsored American Artists' Congress and participated in the radical Artists' Union of Los Angeles. In the years following World War II, he joined a far-left organization called Progressive Citizens of America.

In 1972, while living in East Hampton, he joined with the writer David Myers to coordinate a fundraising event for presidential candidate George McGovern. A later report said, "de Kooning strolled over from his studio next door and contributed a freehand figure sketch that carelessly encroached on the space reserved for the abstractionist Louis Schanker." Schanker retaliated by drawing a border around his image, partly obscuring the de Kooning. "Fisticuffs", said the report, "were narrowly averted."
