= Robert Cenedella =

American artist

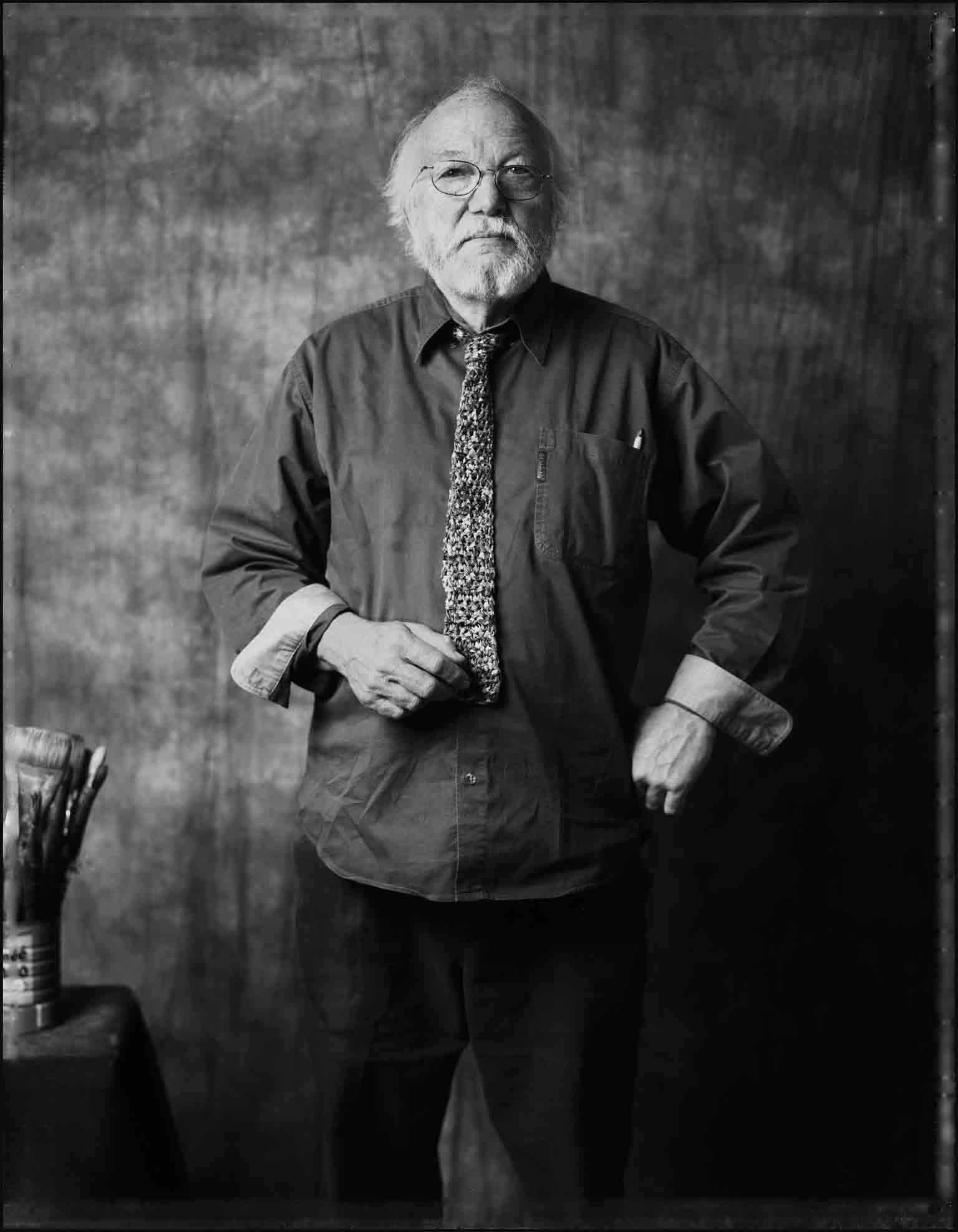
- February 2010, New York, NY
- Born: May 24, 1940 (age 86); Milford, Massachusetts
- Other names: Bob, The Art Bastard
- Education: High School of Music & Art; Art Students League of New York
- Known for: Painter
- Notable work: So Many Roads (Grateful Dead 1965 Forever) (2021); The Senate: No Taxation without Representation (2011); Le Cirque: The First Generation (1998); In Support of the First Amendment (1992); Second Avenue (1962)
- Movement: Satirical
- Spouse: Liz Cenedella (m. 1979)
- Children: 1
- Parents: Russell F. Speirs (Biological); Robert P. Cenedella, Sr. (Legal) (father); Connie Billsbury Cenedella (mother)
- Website: https://RobertCenedella.com/

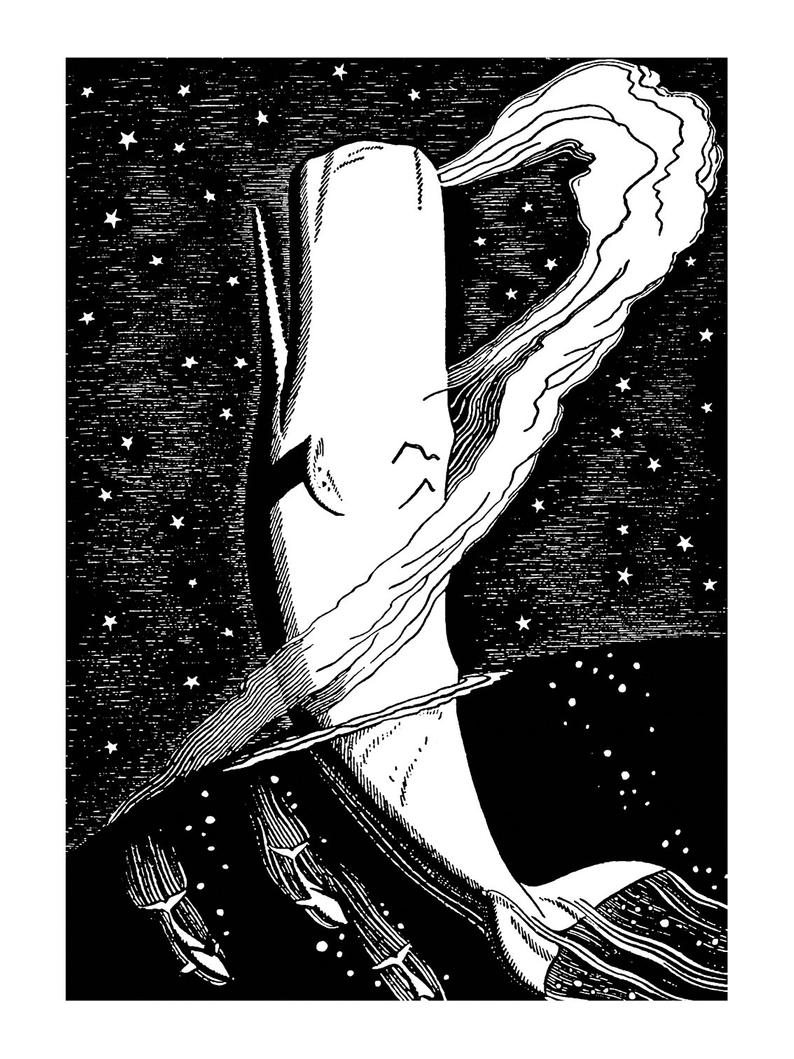
A illustration of Moby Dick by Rockwell Kent, which inspired him to pursue art

Robert P. Cenedella, Jr. (born May 24, 1940) is an American artist. He became well known for several of his paintings, including commissions by Bacardi, Heinz, Absolut Vodka and Le Cirque.

== Early life ==
Robert Cenedella was born in Milford, Massachusetts, on May 24, 1940. He grew up in Wilton, Connecticut, with his two older sisters, and later moved to New York in his early teens. At the age of 4, Cenedella looked at an edition of Moby Dick illustrated by Rockwell Kent, which inspired him to pursue art. Naturally left-handed, Cenedella was forced at an early age to use his right-hand. Cenedella had difficulty learning to read, showed signs of dyslexia, and developed a stutter, possibly due to the forced use of his right hand. He stayed in Connecticut with his mother until he was 12, and Robert moved in with his father in New York City. He attended the High School of Music and Art in New York, but was expelled for writing a satirical letter about the atom bomb drill to the school's principal. In 1957, in response to the "I Like Elvis" button craze, Cenedella and Edmund Leites made the "I Like Ludwig" button. The button became a national seller, making it in an article of Observation Post and a comic of Peanuts where Charlie Brown sees Schroeder wearing the button. Cenedella continued to receive his formal education at The Art Students League of New York, where he studied under the German satirical painter George Grosz. In 1988, he took over the George Grosz Chair at The Art Students League and taught three courses from 1988 to 2016. From 2016 to 2020, he continued to teach courses on a limited basis. He has been on a sabbatical since the onset of the COVID-19 pandemic, and is painting full-time in his new studio in Maine.

== Career ==
=== 1950s-1960s; Satirical paintings, pop art, and Hostility dart boards ===
In the 1950s, Cenedella began to paint, the same time when there was a boom in abstract expressionism. His main inspirations were Reginald Marsh, Ben Shahn, and George Bellows. In reaction to Pop Art and Andy Warhol, he put on an art show titled Yes Art from October 19- November 6 of '65, giving out S&H green stamps, satirizing pop art to the point of absurdity. He did it as a "farewell to art" and didn't paint for the next ten years.

One of his most controversial works was the Hostility Dart Board which had the faces of Lyndon B. Johnson, Nixon, The Lady Bird, Bobby Kennedy, and Neil Reagan. The boards were later discontinued on June 12, 1968, by Robert himself. In 1968, he made illustrations for the Karl Marx book The Communist Manifesto which has his signature satirical style. WBAI sold Cenedella's 1968 version of the book after his recognition from the 2016 documentary Art Bastard.

=== 1970s-present ===
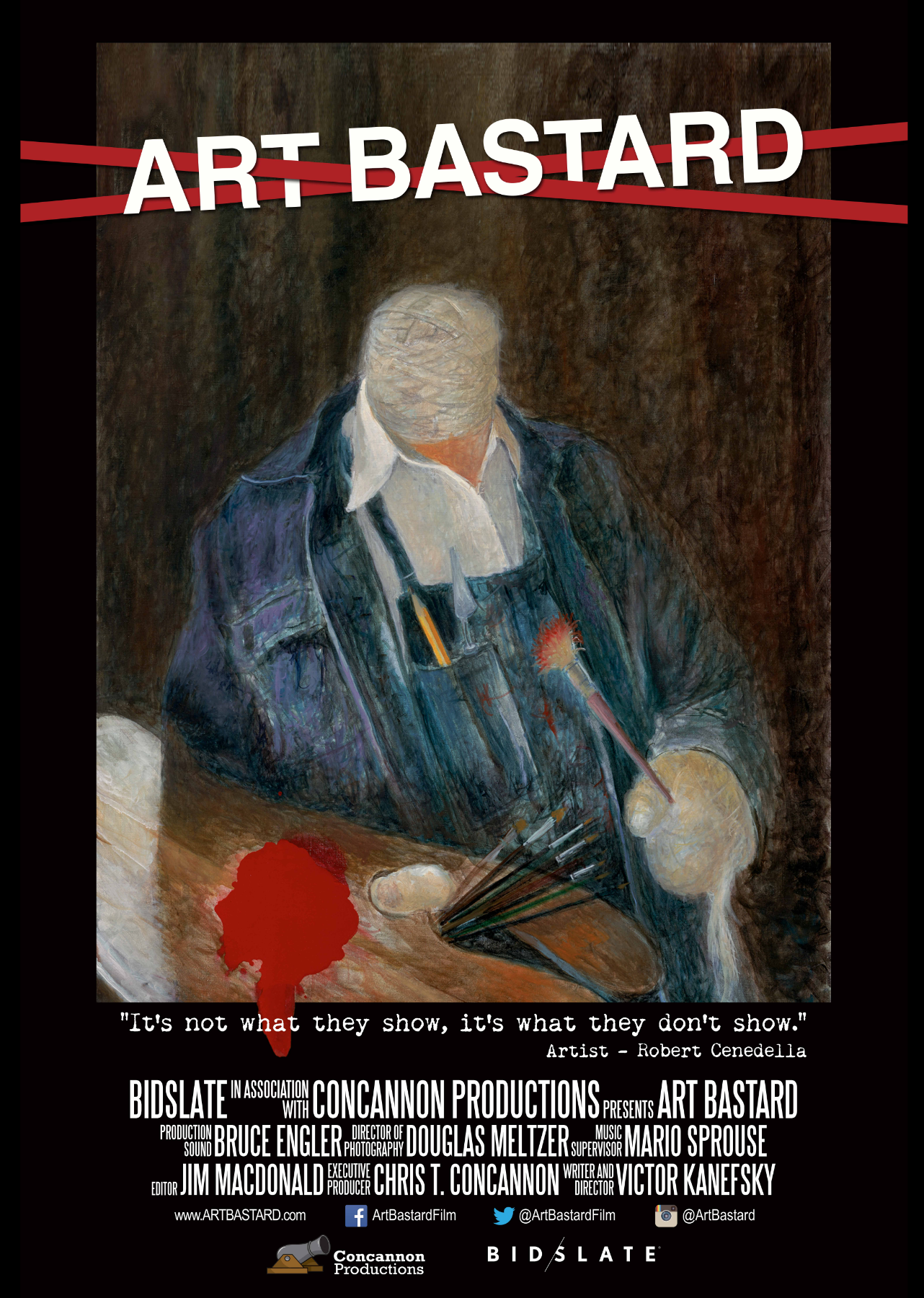
Theatrical poster for the documentary detailing the journey of Robert Cenedella, Art Bastard (2016)

From 1965 to 1974, Cenedella took a pause from painting full-time. He decided to take up a 9-5 job and worked at an ad agency during this time. After getting home from his job, he predominately drew Black & White Ink Brush Drawings late into the night. There are only two paintings known to have been done during his hiatus from the Art world, The Cross (1971) and George Grosz in America (1973). In 1975, he began painting full-time once again and choose to paint frequented bars, New York landmarks/landscapes, and commented on the current political climate.

Following a tradition in art established by the likes of Pieter Brueghel, George Bellows, Marcel Duchamp, Honoré Daumier, William Hogarth and George Grosz before him, Robert Cenedella's works are known for their pictorial satire, humor and fantasy. His art chronicles the changing rituals and myths of society in contemporary America. In the last 20 years, Cenedella has amassed considerable international praise as well as inclusion in numerous public and private collections. His commissions include works for the Bacardi Int’l,Absolut Vodka, a theater piece for Tony Randall, and two paintings for the Le Cirque 2000 Restaurant in New York and Mexico City. Cenedella's “Le Cirque — The First Generation” still hangs at the restaurant's entryway and is featured in the book “A Table at Le Cirque”.

In September 1985, Cenedella exhibited at the Château de Bagatelle in the Bois de Boulogne in Paris, France, a show sponsored by then-mayor Jacques Chirac. In 1988, he painted Santa Claus for a one-man show at Saatchi & Saatchi ad agency's headquarters in New York. The painting garnered controversy even before the show opened and was taken down by the agency. In December 1997, Santa Claus (1988) was displayed for the second time in public in a front window of The Art Students League of New York. Despite the complaints from New York's Catholic League, the school refused to take down the painting and kept it on display for the holiday season.

In 1990, Cenedella was included in the Amnesty International Exhibition in SoHo, Manhattan. In December 1994, he had a retrospective exhibit at the Galerie Am Scheunenviertel in Berlin, Germany, which was a tribute to his former mentor and ran concurrently with the George Grosz Centennial Exhibition at the National Gallery (Berlin). That same year, Cenedella's concept of selling shares of stock of his painting 2001 — A Stock Odyssey (1986) was disclosed in a New York Times feature article.

From 1995 to 2000, Cenedella exhibited and lectured around the United States. From March to May 2003, a retrospective of the artist's political works was sponsored by The Nation Institute and held at the New York executive offices of The Nation magazine. This covered subjects ranging from the Selma riots to the preemptive war on Iraq, and was the first exhibition given to an American artist by The Nation. On March 11, 2004, Cenedella unveiled “The Easel Painting Revival” at Le Cirque 2000. In the spring of 2005, Cenedella held a solo exhibition at Colgate University in Hamilton, New York, and conducted a lecture entitled: “WHAT isn’t ART.”

Cenedella's life and works are the subject of the 2016 documentary film, Art Bastard. The film was submitted to the Academy of Motion Picture Arts and Sciences for the 2016 Oscar race and was in consideration for the Documentary Feature category for the 89th Academy Awards. It has received multiple awards in the festival circuit, such as Winner of Best Documentary at the Manchester Film Festival and Winner of Best Documentary and Best Director — Documentary at the Idllywild International Festival of Cinema.

In 2015, Cenedella was commissioned to create a painting titled Fín del Mundo, a triptych which "captures the chaos surrounding Donald Trump's march to the White House." It was displayed in time for the United States presidential election on November 2, 2016, at Central Park Fine Arts. In 2017, Fín del Mundo along with Cenedella's newest work, Pence on Earth, "which depicts Mike Pence dressed as the Pope, with a giant Trump standing over him in a uniform," were featured in Huffington Post. From April 28 to May 12, 2021, his work was sold at an online auction by Le Cirque.

=== Controversy ===
In 2017, he got controversy for displaying his 20 year old painting again, The Presence of Man, previously named just Santa Claus, which depicts a crucified Santa Claus with presents in front of him. Cenenella wrote a response, "I didn't replace Christ with Santa Claus: Commercialism and Capitalism did." The painting has gotten controversy in 1997 when it debuted. In 2018, he filed 2 complaints for The Metropolitan Museum of Art for not showing his art work and he tried to sue them for $100 million for starting an unlawful conspiracy, but the case was dismissed.

== Selected list of works ==
- Gallery Opening (1962)
- Second Avenue (1962)
- Southern Dogs (1963)
- Heinz 57 (1965)
- Santa Fe Rider (1981)
- 42nd Street (1983)
- The Rape of the IRT (1984)
- The Balcony (1985)
- 2001 - A Stock Odyssey (1986)
- The Giants (1986)
- Soho Lives (1987)
- The Absolut Bar (1988)
- The Presence of Man (Santa Claus) (1988)
- Yellow Ribbons (1991)
- In Support of the First Amendment (1992)
- Le Cirque — The First Generation (1998)
- Impeachment Off the Table (2008)
- The Senate: No Taxation without Representation (2011)
- Fin del Mundo (2016)
- So Many Roads (Grateful Dead 1965-Forever) (2021)
