= Dawoud Bey =

American photographer and educator

- Born: David Edward Smikle; November 25, 1953 (age 72); Queens, New York, U.S.
- Education: BFA, Empire State College; MFA, Yale University School of Art
- Known for: Photography
- Notable work: Harlem, USA; Class Pictures; The Birmingham Project; Night Coming Tenderly, Black
- Children: Ramon Smikle
- Awards: MacArthur Fellowship

Dawoud Bey (born David Edward Smikle; November 25, 1953) is an American photographer, artist and educator known for his large-scale art photography and street photography portraits, including American adolescents in relation to their community, and other often marginalized subjects. In 2017, Bey was named a MacArthur Fellow by the John D. and Catherine T. MacArthur Foundation and is regarded as one of the "most innovative and influential photographers of his generation".

Bey is a professor and Distinguished Artist at Columbia College Chicago. According to The New York Times, "in the seemingly simple gesture of photographing Black subjects in everyday life, [Bey, an African American,] helped to introduce Blackness in the context of fine art long before it was trendy, or even accepted"

== Early life and education ==
Born David Edward Smikle in New York City's Jamaica, Queens neighborhood, he changed his name to Dawoud Bey in the early 1970s. According to The New York Times, "'Dawoud' is Arabic for David, and 'Bey' is in honor of James Hawthorne Bey, a jazz percussionist whom Bey sought out [in his youth] to learn traditional African drumming." Bey graduated from Benjamin N. Cardozo High School. He studied at the School of Visual Arts in New York from 1977 to 1978, and spent the next two years as part of the CETA-funded Cultural Council Foundation Artists Project. In 1990, he graduated with a BFA in Photography from Empire State College, and received his MFA from Yale University School of Art in 1993.

Bey didn't receive his first camera until he was 15, and has stated until that point he wanted to become a musician. Early musical inspirations included John Coltrane and early photography inspirations were James Van Der Zee and Roy Decarava. In his youth, Bey joined the Black Panthers Party and sold their newspaper on street corners.

== Career ==
Bey does not consider his work to be traditional documentary. He'll pose subjects, remind them of gestures and sometimes give them accessories. Over the course of his career, Bey has participated in more than 20 artist residencies, which have allowed him to work directly his subjects.

A product of the 1960s, Bey said both he and his work are products of the attitude, "if you're not part of the solution, you're part of the problem." This philosophy significantly influenced his artistic practice and resulted in a way of working that is both community-focused and collaborative in nature. Bey's earliest photographs, in the style of street photography, evolved into a seminal five-year project documenting the everyday life and people of Harlem in Harlem USA (1975–1979) that was exhibited at the Studio Museum in Harlem in 1979. In 2012, the Art Institute of Chicago mounted the first complete showing of the "Harlem, USA" photographs since that original exhibition, adding several never before printed photographs to the original group of twenty-five vintage prints. The complete group of photographs were acquired at that time by the AIC.

During the 1980s, Bey collaborated with the artist David Hammons, documenting the latter's performance pieces - Bliz-aard Ball Sale and Pissed Off.

Over time Bey proves that he develops a bond with his subjects with being more political. The article "Exhibits Challenge Us Not to Look Away Photographers Focus on Pain, Reality in the City" by Carolyn Cohen from the Boston Globe, identifies Bey's work as having a "definite political edge" to it according to Roy DeCarava. He writes more about the aesthetics of Beys work and how it is associated with documentary photography and how his work shows empathy for his subjects. This article also mentions Bey exhibiting his work at the Walker Art Center, where Kelly Jones identifies the strength of his work and his relationship with his subjects once again.

Of his work with teenagers Bey has said, "My interest in young people has to do with the fact that they are the arbiters of style in the community; their appearance speaks most strongly of how a community of people defines themselves at a particular historical moment." During a residency at the Addison Gallery of American Art in 1992, Bey began photographing students from a variety of high schools both public and private, in an effort to "reach across lines of presumed differences" among the students and communities. This new direction in his work guided Bey for the next fifteen years, including two additional residencies at the Addison, an ample number of similar projects across the country, and culminated in a major 2007 exhibition and publication of portraits of teenagers organized by Aperture and entitled Class Pictures. Alongside each of the photographs in Class Pictures, is a personal statement written by each subject. "[Bey] manages to capture all the complicated feelings of being young — the angst, the weight of enormous expectations, the hope for the future — with a single look."

‘The Birmingham Project’ (2012) is based on the terrorist-bombing of the 16th Street Baptist Church in Birmingham, Alabama and its victims that occurred on Sunday the 15th of September 1963. The explosion created a hole that was "large enough to drive a big truck through". The 1963 FBI report states that the bombing killed 4 children; Addie Collins, Carol Robertson, Cynthia Wesley (all aged 14) and Denise McNair (age 10) as well as injuring 16 other people. 2 African American boys, James Johnny Robinson (age 16) and Virgil Ware (age 13) were also killed by police in racially motivated attacks after a resulting segregation rally.

Each photograph in the project is a juxtaposition of two portraits of Birmingham residents. One of a person the same age as the victims when they died and the other of an adult the age of the victim should they have survived. These diptychs are accompanied by a split-screen video titled ‘9.15.63’ which recreates the journey of a car-ride to the church from the perspective of a child. The video shows locations "charged with significance for the black community in Birmingham during the Civil Rights era—a schoolroom, a lunch counter, a barbershop, and a beauty parlor".

‘Night Coming Tenderly, Black’ (2017) is a series of 25 photographs by Bey that reimagines the final part of the journey along the ‘Underground Railroad’. The inspiration for the project stems from Roy DeCarava’s (1919-2009) dark photography. The exhibition title was inspired by a line from a poem titled ‘Dream Variations’ by Langston Hughes.

The ‘Underground Railroad’ was not a physical railroad but a system in early-mid 19th century U.S.A. It consisted of routes, safehouses and abolitionists that helped fugitive-slaves escape from southern states to northern states and Canada until the Emancipation Proclamation in 1863. It was called the ‘Underground Railroad’ as its operations had to be conducted secretly at night but also because railroad terms served as code words.

Bey explains that the intention of the project was "to recreate the spatial and sensory experiences of those moving furtively through the darkness." These landscape photographs, that were taken in the day were printed in dark black and grey tones which allowed details to emerge slowly. He explains these dark tones as being "a metaphor for an enveloping physical darkness, a passage to liberation that was a protective cover for the escaping African American slaves."

‘Dawoud Bey: 2 American projects’ is a hardcover book published in 2020 that combines 2 of Dawoud Bey’s projects; ‘The Birmingham project’ and ‘Night Coming Tenderly, Black’. The book was designed by Pentagram for ‘An American Project’; a retrospective of Bey’s work in 2020 held in SFMOMA and co-organised by the Whitney Museum of American Art. Across Bey’s career he has become known for his community-based work. He states that his photography "is an ethical practice requiring collaboration with his subjects". In recent times, his practice has focused on presenting the histories of black communities through the visualisation of their contemporary lives.

The photography in ‘Dawoud Bey: Two American Projects’ is a departure from Bey’s colour photography. The monochrome images of ‘The Birmingham Project’ and ‘Night Coming Tenderly, Black’ show a "focus on historical events and collective memory". This allows them to tell a linked story of "past and present, landscapes and portraits, slavery and terrorism." Published by Yale University Press, and edited by Corey Keller and Elisabeth Sherman, it presents the projects in tandem and includes the poem ‘Dream Variations’ by Langston Hughes as well as accompanying texts by Steven Nelson, Torkwase Dyson, Claudia Rankine and Imani Perry to contextualise Bey’s work historically and thematically.

Bey has lived in Chicago, Illinois since 1998. He is a professor of art and Distinguished College Artist at Columbia College Chicago.

== Awards ==
- 1983: Artist fellowship at Creative Artists Public Service (CAPS), New York
- 1986: Artist fellowship from the New York Foundation for the Arts
- 1991: Regional fellowship from the National Endowment for the Arts
- 2002: John Simon Guggenheim Memorial Foundation Fellowship
- 2017: MacArthur Fellowship from the John D. and Catherine T. MacArthur Foundation
- 2019: Art Award, Infinity Awards, International Center of Photography, New York
- 2021: Induction into the International Photography Hall of Fame and Museum

== Exhibitions ==
Bey has exhibited in a number of solo and group shows including Dawoud Bey: Portraits 1975-1995 at the Walker Art Center in 1995, Dawoud Bey at the Queens Museum of Art in 1998, Dawoud Bey: The Chicago Project at the David and Alfred Smart Museum of Art in 2003, Dawoud Bey: Detroit Portraits at the Detroit Institute of Arts in 2004, and Class Pictures, organized by Aperture Foundation and on view initially at the Addison Gallery of American Art in 2007, and then touring to museums throughout the country for four years, including the Contemporary Arts Museum Houston, the Indianapolis Museum of Art, and the Milwaukee Art Museum among others.

His work "The Birmingham Project" commemorates the six young African Americans killed in Birmingham, Alabama on September 15, 1963. The exhibition opened at the Birmingham Museum of Art in September 2013, fifty years after the event. The exhibition opened at George Eastman House, International Museum of Photography and Film in 2016.

In early 2019, the Art Institute of Chicago hosted an exhibition titled "Dawoud Bey: Night Coming Tenderly, Black", consisting of twenty-five black and white photographs that were captured along the Underground Railroad in Cleveland and Hudson, Ohio. In 2022, the Museum of Fine Arts Boston hosted "Dawoud Bey: Night Coming Tenderly, Black," consisting of ten of these photographs.

From November 20, 2020-November 22, 2020 and May 14, 2021-August 5, 2021, the Smithsonian American Art Museum hosted an exhibition "Dawoud Bey and William H. Johnson."

A retrospective exhibition, titled "An American Project" was curated by the Whitney Museum and SFMOMA in 2019-2021, traveling to San Francisco, the High Museum in Atlanta, and New York City.

From November 18, 2023 to February 25, 2024, the Virginia Museum of Fine Arts (VMFA) hosted "Dawoud Bey: Elegy." The exhibition included the film installations '350,000' and 'Evergreen' along with a trilogy of photo series: 'Stony the Road,' commissioned by the VMFA, 'In This Here Place' as well as 'Night Coming Tenderly, Black'.

From November 17, 2024–May 11, 2025, Denver Art Museum exhibited “Dawoud Bey: Street Portraits” featuring portraits Bey made 1988-1991.

Bey's work was included in the 2025 exhibition Photography and the Black Arts Movement, 1955–1985 at the National Gallery of Art.

== Collections ==
Bey's photographs are included in many permanent collections in the United States and internationally, such as the Pérez Art Museum Miami, Art Institute of Chicago, Cleveland Museum of Art, Brooklyn Museum, Museum of Modern Art, New York, the Whitney Museum, J. Paul Getty Museum, the Museum of Contemporary Photography, Tate Modern, the San Francisco Museum of Modern Art, the Studio Museum in Harlem, and the Solomon R. Guggenheim, among others.

== Publications ==
- Portraits 1975–1995. With essays by Kellie Jones, with A.D. Coleman and Jessica Hagedorn, photography (Minneapolis: Walker Art Center, 1995).
- The Chicago Project. With essays by Jacqueline Terrassa and Stephanie Smith (Chicago: Smart Museum of Art, 2003).
- Class Pictures: Photographs by Dawoud Bey. With essays by Taro Nettleton, interview with Carrie Mae Weems (New York: Aperture, 2007).
- Harlem, U.S.A. With essays by Matthew Witkovsky and Sharifa Rhodes-Pitt (Chicago: Art Institute of Chicago and Yale University Press, 2012)
- Picturing People. With an essay by Arthur Danto, Interview by Hamza Walker (Chicago: Renaissance Society at the University of Chicago, 2012)
- The Birmingham Project. With an essay by Ron Platt (Birmingham Museum of Art, 2012)
- Seeing Deeply. With essays by Sarah Lewis, Deborah Willis, David Travis, Hilton Als, Jacqueline Terrassa, Rebecca Walker, Maurice Berger, and Leigh Raiford (Austin: University of Texas Press, 2018)
- Street Portraits. London: Mack, 2021. ISBN 978-1-913620-10-3. With an essay by Greg Tate.
