= Jenny Dixon =

American arts administrator

- Born: 1 October 1950; Montreal, Quebec
- Spouse: John R. Boone

Jane ("Jenny") Hoadley Dixon (born October 1, 1950) is an American arts administrator. Dixon has undertaken initiatives which contributed to the development of four New York City cultural organizations—the Public Art Fund, Lower Manhattan Cultural Council, Bronx Museum of the Arts, and Isamu Noguchi Foundation and Garden Museum. Her work has also focused on individual artists as vital contributors to society. Dixon is currently Director Emerita of the Noguchi Museum and Trustee Emerita of the Public Art Fund.

== Early life and education ==
Dixon was born in Montreal, Quebec, Canada, and raised in Pointe Claire, Quebec, and in Riverside and Stonington, Connecticut. She attended Saint Margaret's School in Waterbury, Connecticut, and received a Bachelor of Fine Arts in sculpture and a Bachelor of Arts in art education from the University of Colorado Boulder. She also earned a master's degree in business policy from Columbia University.

== Career ==
=== Public Art Fund ===
In 1977, Dixon became the inaugural director of the Public Art Fund, which was created from the consolidation of two organizations driven by Doris Freedman: City Walls and the Public Arts Council, where Dixon had worked as Freedman's assistant. Dixon initiated, designed, and drafted the enacting guidelines for the Percent for Art law that would require New York City to allocate one percent of capital project funding to commissioning works of art. Her role “was critical in the legislative process.”

During her 11 years at the Public Art Fund, Dixon oversaw the sponsorship of more than 100 public art installations throughout New York.

=== Lower Manhattan Cultural Council ===
From 1986 to 1997, Dixon was executive director of the Lower Manhattan Cultural Council. During her tenure, she expanded the organization's activities, including establishing a grant program to support small and emerging Manhattan-based arts organizations and a World Trade Center-based artist in residence program.

=== The Bronx Museum of the Arts ===
Dixon became executive director of the Bronx Museum of the Arts in 1999. In her first year, she retired a deficit of 20% of the annual budget and ended the year with a surplus. Dixon secured $11.2 million in capital funding from New York City to renovate the museum and expand its exhibition galleries. She also organized the museum's first exhibition to travel abroad. On Dixon's final day of work at the Bronx Museum, she secured a $1 million Ford Foundation stabilization grant.

=== Isamu Noguchi Garden Museum ===
In 2003, Dixon became director of the Isamu Noguchi Foundation and the Isamu Noguchi Garden Museum, a subsidiary of the foundation. During her nearly 15-year tenure, the museum was accredited by the New York State Board of Regents and the American Alliance of Museums. She also turned the foundation and museum into an outward looking institution and initiated exhibitions to include works by artists other than Noguchi and developed traveling exhibitions and educational programming. She also secured nearly $20 million from the state of New York, enabling the museum to stabilize its facilities, while at the same time more than doubling the annual operating budget.

In June 2017, Dixon announced that she would retire from the position at the end of the year. She became director emeritus, and the museum established the Jenny Dixon Acquisitions Fund in her honor.

=== "Artists in the City" ===
From 1980 to 1985, Dixon was a producer and host of WNYC radio's "Artists in the City", a weekly program that introduced listeners to artists working throughout New York, providing its audience with a greater understanding and awareness of the city's visual arts scene. Dixon produced more than 200 shows, including a 1985 interview with Richard Serra during the height of the controversy over "Tilted Arc", the Federal Plaza installation that led to a bitter fight between local government employees and those defending the rights of artists.

=== Teaching ===
Throughout her career, Dixon has taught at institutions in the greater metropolitan area. She was an associate professor of art history at the Cooper Union for the Advancement of Science & Art (1994–2001); associate professor in liberal studies, Parsons School of Design (1998–2000); and associate professor in arts administration graduate program, New York University (1998).

=== Advocacy ===
A co-founder of the Lower Manhattan Loft Tenants, Dixon was instrumental in the passage of the New York State Loft Law 101, designed to protect tenants, primarily artists in NYC, who were living in commercial or factory buildings. It has two goals: to bring those buildings up to residential safety and fire codes, and to give rights and rent protection to the tenants who live there.

== Personal life ==
In 1991, Dixon married John R. Boone, a contemporary artist whose work focuses on colloquial expressions painted in a digital font.

== Publications ==
- Dixon, Jenny (author). (2018). “Masayuki Koorida: In Consideration of his Japanese Spirit,” Masayuki Koorida: Sculpture. Trenton: Grounds for Sculpture. ISBN 978-0-96655644-5-7
- Hart, Dakin (editor), Jenny Dixon (contributor). (2016). Museum of Stones: Ancient and Contemporary Art at the Noguchi Museum. Long Island City, NY: The Isamu Noguchi Foundation and Garden Museum; London: In association with D Giles Limited, 2016. ISBN 978-1907804861
- Kirch, Matthew (author), Dakin Hart and Mark Dean Johnson (editors). Jenny Dixon (Foreword). (2019). Changing and Unchanging Things: Noguchi and Hasegawa in Postwar Japan. Berkeley: University of California Press. ISBN 978-0520298224 https://www.ucpress.edu/book/9780520298224/changing-and-unchanging-things
- Rychlak, Bonnie (editor), Jenny Dixon (foreword). (2007). Design: Isamu Noguchi and Isamu Kenmochi. New York : Five Ties Pub. in association with the Isamu Noguchi Foundation and Garden Museum. ISBN 9780979472701
- Shore, Stephen and Tina Barney (authors), Jenny Dixon (foreword). (2015). The Noguchi Museum – A Portrait. London: Phaidon Press. ISBN 978-0714870281
- Wolf, Amy (author), Jenny Dixon (foreword). (2010). On Becoming an Artist: Isamu Noguchi and His Contemporaries, 1922–1960. New York: The Noguchi Museum, New York. ISBN 0970931042
