= Willie Birch =

African American artist

- Born: 1942 (age 83–84); New Orleans, Louisiana, U.S.
- Education: Southern University New Orleans, Maryland Institute College of Art
- Known for: Drawing, Painting, Sculpture
- Website: www.williebirch.com

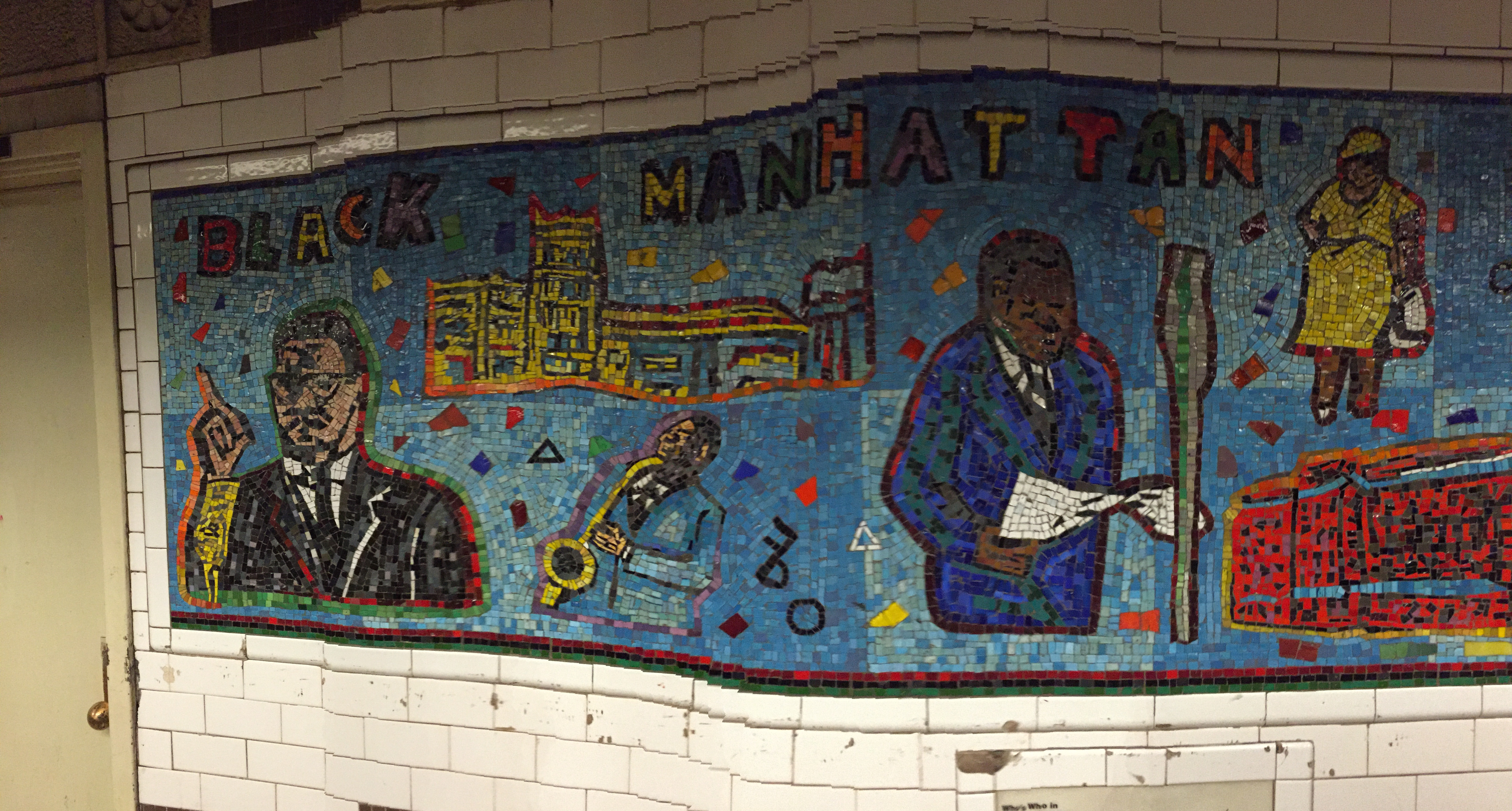
135 Street art vc

Willie Birch (born 1942) is an American visual artist who works in a variety of mediums including drawing, painting, and sculpture. Birch was born in New Orleans, and currently lives and works in New Orleans. He completed a BA at Southern University in New Orleans, and an MFA at Maryland Institute College of Art in Baltimore, Maryland.

== Work ==
Birch lived in New York after graduate school, where he became known for papier-mâché sculptures. While in New York, during the years 1978 and 1979, he was part of the Cultural Council Foundation Artists Project, funded by the Comprehensive Employment and Training Act (CETA). Reviewing an exhibition at Exit Art in New York City, Roberta Smith described his 1990s work in the New York Times as "a storytelling art carried out with immense visual expertise." Birch moved back to New Orleans in 1994, and in 1997 he began working on a series of portraits of people in his neighborhood. Birch conceptualized the project as a protest against stereotypical images of African-Americans that he saw in the French Quarter: "Stores offered degrading posters, figurines and cards; and street performers used buffoonery to present stereotypical characters." Birch explained that the rest of the city was very different, concluding, "These two contradictory images of New Orleans offered me the opportunity to visualize a body of work that addressed the idea of perception and how we as human beings continue to create, perpetuate, and define peoples as the 'other,' and what that implies in a changing society." The resulting monotypes were printed at the Tamarind Institute.

Birch started working exclusively in black and white after 2000. The resulting large-scale drawings were featured in Prospect.1 in 2008, the triennial exhibition of contemporary art in New Orleans organized by Prospect New Orleans. He typically works in charcoal and acrylic on paper and his images often feature aspects of daily life in New Orleans as well as elements of the city's traditional culture, including brass bands, second lines, and musicians such as Trombone Shorty. Birch was one of six artists featured in "Ten Years Gone" at the New Orleans Museum of Art on the occasion of the ten-year anniversary of Hurricane Katrina in 2015. His work featured images of the plants that took over his yard while the city was closed down after the storm, as well as bronze casts of crawfish mounds, the mud dwellings built by crawfish that had been displaced to his yard by the storm.

== Exhibitions ==
Birch's work has been exhibited across the United States, including Massachusetts Museum of Contemporary Art; The McKinney Avenue Contemporary Museum in Dallas; Delaware Center for the Contemporary Arts, Wilmington, DE; and Southeastern Center for Contemporary Art, Winston-Salem, NC; and Sculpture Center, New York City.

In 2026, Willie Birch's work was featured in the Get in the Game: Sports, Art, Culture, at the Pérez Art Museum Miami, Florida. The show traveled from the San Francisco Museum of Modern Art addressing social issues related to sports. The Miami iteration took place around FIFA's World Cup tournament in North America. That same year, several of Birch's artworks were featured in a career retrospective exhibit in the California African American Museum.

== Residencies ==
Birch has been an artist in residence at RedLine Milwaukee; New Orleans Center for Creative Arts; and Ecole superieure des beaux-arts de Nantes, France; New Orleans Jazz and Heritage Foundation; Tamarind Institute, Albuquerque, NM; Henry Street Settlement, New York; and The Studio Museum in Harlem, NY.

== Grants and fellowships ==
Birch has served as the James Baldwin Fellow for the United States Artists, and has received the Life Time Achievement Award from the National Conference of Artists (NCA). Birch has received fellowships from The Pollock Krasner Foundation, The Joan Mitchell Foundation, Cue Art Foundation, the Guggenheim Foundation, New York State Council on the Arts, and the National Endowment for the Arts. He has received the Governor's Award from the state of Louisiana and the Mayor's Arts Award from New Orleans.

== Collections ==
Birch's work appears in several collections, including Civil Rights Museum, Memphis, TN; Delaware Center for the Contemporary Arts, Wilmington, DE; Harlem Hospital, New York, NY; Miami-Dade Public Library, Miami, FL; Metropolitan Museum of Art, New York, NY; Microsoft Corporation, Seattle, WA; Mobil Corporation, Fairfax, VA; New Orleans Museum of Art, New Orleans, LA; Ogden Museum of Southern Art, New Orleans, LA; Pennsylvania Academy of the Fine Arts, Philadelphia, PA; Prudential Insurance Company, Newark, NJ; and several private collections.
