= CETA Employment of Artists (1974–1981) =

1973 United States federal law

CETA

U.S. Congress
- Long title: Comprehensive Employment and Training Act
- Enacted by: U.S. Congress
- Enacted: December 28, 1973
- Signed by: President Richard Nixon
- Effective: 1974
- Administered by: City and State agencies

Legislative history
- Bill title: S. 1559, Comprehensive Employment and Training Act of 1973
- Bill citation: Pub. L. 93-203 Comprehensive Employment and Training Act of 1973
- Introduced by: Senator Gaylord Nelson

Keywords
- artist relief, art jobs program, federal artist employment, public art
- Status: Repealed

CETA Employment of Artists (1974–1981) refers to the Comprehensive Employment and Training Act (CETA), which federally employed more than 10,000 artists – visual, performing, and literary – during a span of eight years. This was the largest number of artists supported by Federal funding since the Works Progress Administration (WPA) of the 1930s. It is estimated that an additional 10,000 arts support staff were funded as well. During its peak year, 1980, CETA funding for arts employment funneled up to $300 million (more than $1 billion in 2020 dollars) into the cultural sector – and the economy – of the United States. In comparison, the National Endowment for the Arts budget that year was $159 million.

Unlike the WPA, which included artists in its original design through five specific projects, CETA was designed as a generalized program to provide training and employment for economically disadvantaged, unemployed, and underemployed persons. In addition, federal funding was decentralized under CETA, taking the form of block grants to States, which were then parceled out to county and municipal governments. More than 500 local authorities received funding. In some cities, such as San Francisco, Chicago and New York City, CETA artist employment was organized primarily through centrally administered projects. In most cities and counties, CETA funding was awarded directly to nonprofit organizations for the hiring of artists and arts administrators. Nationally, CETA funding in the arts was based primarily on a service model; rather than being paid for artistic production alone, artists served as teachers, project leaders, ensemble performers and administrators.

== History ==
CETA was signed into law by Richard Nixon in December 1973 in response to a severe economic recession. It started modestly but expanded rapidly, reaching a peak budget of $12 billion in the late 1970s, during President Carter's administration. John Kreidler, an arts administration intern at the San Francisco Arts Commission, was the first to recognize that CETA funds could be used to employ artists. In 1974 he crafted the proposal that resulted in securing CETA money for the city's Neighborhood Arts Program based on a category in the legislation—Title VI – that provided funding for "cyclically unemployed" professionals, such as artists. Subsequently, CETA arts positions were secured in a variety of locations across the country, with some of the largest concentrations in Washington DC, Philadelphia, Phoenix, Minneapolis-Saint Paul, Los Angeles and other cities. In 1977 Chicago instituted a centralized program (called “Artists-in-Residency”), employing 108 artists per year through 1981.

The largest CETA-funded project, the Cultural Council Foundation (CCF) Artists Project, operated in NYC from 1977 to 1980. Among the key folks who established it was Ted Berger, who would later help grow NYFA. At its peak it employed 325 artists (visual, performing and literary) and 32 project administrators (many of them also artists). Within the CCF Project, subcontractors included the Association of American Dance Companies, Jazzmobile, the Brooklyn Philharmonia, the Association of Hispanic Arts, the Black Theatre Alliance, the Foundation for Independent Video and Film and the Foundation for the Community of Artists, which administered a seven-member documentation unit. Four other, independent, CETA-funded artist projects also operated in NYC: Hospital Audiences, La Mama ETC, American Jewish Congress and Theater for the Forgotten. Additional CETA lines were awarded directly to nonprofits through the city's Borough President offices bringing the total in NYC to about 600 positions. CCF Project artists were paid $10,000 per year (about $45K in 2020 dollars), with good health insurance and two weeks paid vacation. In exchange they spent four days per week in community service assignments and one day per week in their studio or study.

== Legacy ==
Because CETA arts employment was primarily service-based rather than production-based, the artistic legacy of CETA in the 1970s is less visible than the public works produced by the Federal Art Project in the 1930s. Also unlike the WPA projects – whose archives were centralized under the Federal government – the archives of the CETA arts projects and initiatives, if they even exist, are widely scattered, hard to locate and hard to access. The largest single set – 55 boxes containing the records of NYC's CCF project – resides in the New York City Municipal Archives.

Despite these hindrances, it is possible to identify, in virtually every municipality that had CETA arts positions, tangible signs of the continuing benefits of the program's contributions. In Philadelphia, for example, several still-prominent arts organizations – the Painted Bride Art Center, the Brandywine Workshop, and the People's Light and Theater Company – were able to expand and stabilize with CETA-funded administrative positions. The larger projects also set a high standard for community service by artists, carefully matching artists with sponsors and following-up with detailed evaluations, as required by the Department of Labor. In general, the larger projects were models of inclusivity (partly in response to DOL regulations) taking gender, race, age (and sometimes neighborhood of residence) into account in order to form broadly representative work forces. On a larger scale, the relationships among artists, cultural institutions, communities, and governing authorities that were established under the CETA arts process continued after CETA funding had ended, serving as a framework for partnerships in the nonprofit cultural sector. Linda Frye Burnham and Steven Durland, in their article for the Public Art Review, state that other positive impacts “included economic and cultural development, an increasing understanding of culture as industry, mutual respect among participants, and the transfer of cultural skills to other occupational areas.”

== Additional Reading ==
Bureaucratizing the Muse: Public Funds and the Cultural Worker by Steven C. Dubin, University of Chicago Press, 1987 (about the Chicago CETA Artist-in-Residence program)
