= Jazzmobile =

New York-based Jazz organization

- Formation: 1964
- Founder: Daphne Arnstein; Billy Taylor
- Purpose: To bring jazz to the largest possible audience by producing concerts, festivals, and special events worldwide
- Headquarters: New York City
- Services: Music concerts, festivals, and special events
- Website: jazzmobile.org

Jazzmobile, Inc. is based in New York City. It is a multifaceted outreach organization committed to bringing, jazz, "America's classical music", to the largest possible audience, by producing concerts, festivals, and special events worldwide. The Jazzmobile educational efforts are now being enhanced by the creation of a nonprofit music publishing company and nonprofit recording company.

== Funding ==
Concerts are funded by the New York State Council on the Arts, the New York City Department of Cultural Affairs, and corporate sponsors such as Anheuser-Busch, the ASCAP Foundation, the Louis Armstrong Educational Foundation, and the Billy Taylor Foundation. Jazzmobile presents, as part of its outdoor concert series, five to ten Afro-Latin/jazz bands on the Jazzmobile's mobile band stage, annually. Jazzmobile is not a membership organization. Using a multi-arts approach (music, dance, drama, poetry, visual, and media arts), Jazzmobile's program is designed to teach and encourage students to express themselves through the creative arts.

== History ==
Jazzmobile was founded in 1964 by Daphne Arnstein, an arts patron and founder of the Harlem Cultural Council, and Dr. William "Billy" Taylor. Ever since, Jazzmobile has been presenting free outdoor summer mobile concerts, bringing jazz musicians to New York City, Washington, D.C., Maryland, Virginia, Essex County, New Jersey, Westchester County, and cities in upstate New York.

In the very beginning of Jazzmobile in the 1960s, artists including John Coltrane, Jimmy Heath, Dizzy Gillespie, Horace Silver, Pharoah Sanders, Albert Ayler, Archie Shepp, Sun Ra, Cecil Taylor, and other black players performed. Past students include Warren Benbow (drums), Roy Campbell Jr. (trumpet), Suezenne Fordham (piano), Najee (saxophone), and T. K. Blue (saxophone).

In 1990, Jazzmobile's Tribute Concert for founder Billy Taylor, part of the JVC Jazz Festival, that featured Nancy Wilson, Ahmad Jamal Trio and Terence Blanchard Quintet. Jazz vocalist Lynette Washington in 2005 was 1st Place Winner in the Jazzmobile Anheuser-Busch Jazz Vocal Competition.

=== Notable staff members ===
- Frank Wess, jazz flautist and tenor saxophonist performed extensively including on award (Grammy) winning recordings. He appeared on Broadway and movie soundtracks, and played with the Count Basie Orchestra, Dizzy Gillespie, Billy Taylor, Billy Eckstine, Nat King Cole and Ella Fitzgerald, just to name a few.
- Chris Albert (trumpet), played and recorded with the Count Basie Big Band, Lionel Hampton and his Orchestra, Blood Sweat & Tears, Thad Jones, Billy Harper and Machito.
- Charles Davis (saxophone), recorded albums as a leader, and performed with artists such as John Coltrane, Kenny Dorham, Philly Joe Jones and Dinah Washington.
- Roland Guerrero (Afro-Lation percussion), performed with Dizzy Gillespie, Stanley Turrentine.
- Rick Stone (guitar), was a performer and educator in New York City with his own recording label, "Jazzand". He performed and recorded with Kenny Barron, Barry Harris, Junior Cook, Ralph LaLama, Eric Alexander, Dennis Irwin, Billy Hart and Hal Galper at venues including Carnegie Hall's Weill Recital Hall, Blue Note and the Smithsonian Institution. Rick held a B.M. from Berklee College of Music and an M.A. from the Aaron Copland School of Music at Queens College, and received several NEA Jazz Performance Fellowships and an IAJE Award for Outstanding Service to Jazz Education.
- Ronnie Mathews (piano), a graduate from the Manhattan School of Music, has performed with Max Roach, Roy Haynes, Dexter Gordon, and Johnny Griffin. He appeared on Broadway as the pianist for the Tony Award winning Broadway musical, Black and Blue and recorded on Spike Lee's movie, Mo' Better Blues. Aside from a string of solo recordings, he taught jazz piano workshops, clinics and masterclasses at Long Island University in New York City. In addition, he published Easy Piano of Thelonious Monk (1989).

== See also ==
- New York Foundation
- CETA Artists Project (NYC)
