= Comprehensive Employment and Training Act =

1973 United States federal law

Comprehensive Employment and Training Act (CETA)

93rd United States Congress
- Citation: Pub. L. 93–203 Comprehensive Employment and Training Act of 1973
- Territorial extent: United States
- Enacted: December 28, 1973
- Signed by: Richard Nixon
- Signed: December 28, 1973

Legislative history
- Bill title: S. 1559, Comprehensive Employment and Training Act of 1973
- Bill citation: Pub. L. 93-203 Comprehensive Employment and Training Act of 1973
- Introduced by: Gaylord Nelson (D–WI)

Repealed by
- Ronald Reagan in March 1984

Related legislation
- Job Training Partnership Act of 1982

Keywords
- artist relief, art jobs program, federal artist employment, public art
- Status: Repealed

The Comprehensive Employment and Training Act (CETA, Pub. L. 93–203) was a United States federal law enacted by the Congress, and signed into law by President Richard Nixon on December 28, 1973 to train workers and provide them with jobs in the public service. The bill was introduced as S. 1559, the Comprehensive Employment and Training Act of 1973, by Democratic Senator Gaylord Nelson of Wisconsin.

The program offered work to those with low incomes and the long term unemployed as well as summer jobs to low income high school students. Full-time jobs were provided for a period of 12 to 24 months in public agencies or private not for profit organizations. The intent was to impart a marketable skill that would allow participants to move to an unsubsidized job. It was an extension of the Works Progress Administration (WPA) program from the 1930s.

Inspired by the WPA's employment of artists in the service to the community in the 1930s, the San Francisco Arts Commission initiated the CETA/Neighborhood Arts Program in the 1970s, which employed painters, muralists, musicians, performing artists, poets and gardeners to work in schools, community centers, prisons and wherever their skills and services were of value to the community. The idea for CETA/Neighborhood Arts Program came from John Kreidler, then working with the Arts Commission as an intern, with the Arts Commission's Neighborhood Arts Program under the direction of Stephen Goldstine. The program was so successful in San Francisco that it became a model for similar programs, nationally. The CETA Artists Project in New York City was one of the largest.

Nine years later, CETA was replaced by the Job Training Partnership Act.
