= New York Foundation for the Arts =

Not-for-profit arts organization

The New York Foundation for the Arts
- Founded: 1971
- Location: New York City, U.S.
- Region served: Global
- Method: Grants, services, programs
- Key people: Michael L. Royce, executive director
- Website: www.nyfa.org

The New York Foundation for the Arts (NYFA) is an independent 501(c)(3) charity, funded through government, foundation, corporate, and individual support, established in 1971. It is part of a network of national not-for-profit arts organizations founded to support individual artists and emerging arts organizations.

== History ==
NYFA was founded in 1971 by the New York State Council on the Arts as an independent organization to facilitate the development of arts activities throughout the State. NYFA has since expanded their programming around the country and internationally focusing on four core program areas: Artists' Fellowships, Fiscal Sponsorship, Professional Development, and Online Resources. As of 2021, the Executive Director is Michael Royce, who succeeded long time leader Ted Berger.
