= CETA Artists Project (NYC) =

U.S. Congress
- Long title: Cultural Council Foundation (CCF) Artists Project
- Enacted: December 28, 1973
- Signed by: President Richard Nixon
- Effective: 1977
- Administered by: NYC Cultural Council Foundation and NYC Department of Cultural Affairs

Legislative history
- Bill title: S. 1559, the Job Training and Community Services Act
- Bill citation: Pub. L. 93-203 Job Training and Community Services Act
- Introduced by: Senator Gaylord Nelson

Repealed by
- President Ronald Reagan

Related legislation
- Comprehensive Employment and Training Act (CETA)

Keywords
- artist relief, art jobs program, federal artist employment, public art
- Status: Repealed

CETA Artists Project (1977–1980) in New York City employed approximately 500 accomplished but underemployed artists in five programs, the largest of which (employing 325 artists and 32 administrators during its second year) was the Cultural Council Foundation (CCF) Artists Project. The project was funded under the Comprehensive Employment and Training Act (CETA) (1974–80) when more than 10,000 artists – visual, performing, and literary – were employed nationally. This was the largest number of artists supported by Federal funding since the Works Progress Administration of the 1930s.

In New York City, the artists were placed with hundreds of community sponsors for whom they taught classes, led workshops, developed public artworks, gave musical and theatrical performances, and performed community documentation. In exchange, they received a generous salary, benefits, and one day per week to work in their studio or on independent creative projects. Many of the participating artists — and project administrators — went on to successful careers in the arts after CETA funding cutbacks forced the termination of the project in 1980.

== History ==
During the severe unemployment crisis in the U.S. during the mid-1970s, the federal Comprehensive Employment and Training Act (CETA) program was created. Signed into law by Richard Nixon in December 1973, it started modestly but expanded rapidly, reaching a peak budget of $12 billion in the late 1970s, during the Jimmy Carter administration. One of the CETA funding categories, Title VI, provided for "cyclically unemployed" professionals, which included artists (visual, performing and literary). In 1974, the first CETA program designed to employ artists was created in San Francisco, This became a model for other cities. Outside of these projects, a number of artists and arts administrators were hired with CETA funding through direct assignment of positions by state and municipal governments. In all, more than 10,000 positions were created nationally before CETA was defunded by the Reagan administration after 1980.

== CETA Artists Project (NYC) ==
In 1977, five CETA Title VI artists projects were created in New York City employing over 500 artists. Two hundred of these artists were part of programs administered by four cultural nonprofits: Hospital Audiences, La Mama ETC, the American Jewish Congress and the Theater for the Forgotten. The largest project, with 300 artists, was administered by the nonprofit Cultural Council Foundation, with the city's Department of Cultural Affairs as a silent partner. The CCF Artists Project was active from 1978 through early 1980. Its artists fulfilled thousands of community assignments; created hundreds of public artworks, and gave scores of musical, dance and theatrical performances free to the public.

Upon the announcement of the NYC CCF project in late 1977, more than 4000 artists applied for the 300 available positions. To be eligible, they had to demonstrate both their accomplishment as artists (through reviews by professional panels) and the fact that they had received virtually no income in the previous year. The project paid participants $10,000 per year, with benefits (seen as a very generous salary by artists at the time). They were assigned to work in community and project assignments four days per week; the fifth day was meant to be used for studio time and self-initiated projects. Two of the artists hired, Herman Cherry and Joseph Delaney, had been in the WPA project forty years earlier.

CCF itself directly oversaw most of the artists in its project, but others reported to one of seven subcontractors: the Association of American Dance Companies, Jazzmobile, the Brooklyn Philharmonia, the Association of Hispanic Arts, the Black Theatre Alliance, the Foundation for Independent Video and Film. The Foundation for the Community of Artists, because of its orientation towards news reporting (it published the Artworkers News, later renamed Art & Artists) was charged with operating a seven-member documentation unit made up of photographers, writers and an archivist.

The NYC arts establishment was generally supportive of the CETA artists projects. One of the most visible figures was the city's relatively new commissioner of cultural affairs, Henry Geldzahler (appointed by mayor Ed Koch in 1977). Geldzahler appeared at many project events and spoke at one of the CCF project's regular meetings (at which the artists were updated on project issues and given their paychecks).

The majority of artists were assigned directly to community organizations. Others worked in media-specific teams (such as FIVF's film crews) or in performing companies (such as the Black Theater Alliance). Some were commissioned to do public works such as murals. A group of writers and poets became the mobile "Words to Go" troupe.

CCF’s contract with the Department of Employment called for the artists to engage in “classes, workshops and master classes, lectures and demonstrations, consultancies, design services, literary services, theater services, performances, creation of new works (such as murals, dances, plays), residencies and exhibitions.” Minimum numbers were specified for each activity. Among the community organizations requesting one or more CETA artists were schools, cultural centers and museums, community centers, senior centers, civic and historical associations, city and borough agencies. The CCF project more than met its contractual obligations during its first year, doubling the expected performance in most categories. When it was reauthorized for 1979, the number of funded artists was increased from 300 to 325.

Several times during the project, CETA artists demonstrated publicly both to support continued CETA funding at the federal level and to urge the City of New York to extend its contract with CCF. Nevertheless, by the beginning of 1980, CETA funding was disappearing and the CCF Artists Project was forced to close. One of its last acts was the publication of the book Artists Project: on the documentation and utilization of largely untapped resources, which thoroughly documents the history of the project. Many of its images were made by the three photographers of the documentation unit, George Malave, Blaise Tobia and Sarah Wells.

== Legacy ==
Numerous artists employed in the CCF project went on to successful careers. Among them: sculptors Ursula von Rydingsvard, Christy Rupp and James Biederman; painters Hunt Slonem and Willie Birch; photographic artist Dawoud Bey; filmmaker and TV producer Marc Levin; poets Bob Holman and Pedro Pietri; dancers Martha Bowers and Vic Stornant. Some of the project’s administrators also achieved subsequent success: project director Rochelle Slovin became the founding director of the Museum of the Moving Image; coordinator Liz Thompson became the director of the Jacob's Pillow Dance Festival and later of the Lower Manhattan Cultural Council; coordinator Blondell Cummings gained fame as a dancer/choreographer, coordinator Suzanne Randolph became a widely recognized arts consultant, and Associate Director Charles Bernstein founded the SUNY-Buffalo Poetics Program.

Forty years later, only a few CETA public art projects remain. Most visible among these are two ceramic murals in Brooklyn’s Clark Street subway station. (The artists were Johan Selenraad and Alan Samalin; realization in ceramic was by Joe Stallone). Four successful and popular murals installed at the World Trade Center were destroyed in both the February 26, 1993 and the September 11, 2001 attacks. The Archives of the City of New York houses historical materials from and about the project.

In 2017, New York City recognized CETA's impact on the arts when it highlighted the program as a case study in Mayor Bill de Blasio's Cultural Plan, CreateNYC.

== See also ==
- Comprehensive Employment and Training Act (CETA)
- CETA Employment of Artists (1974-1981)
