= Judd Tully =

American art historian

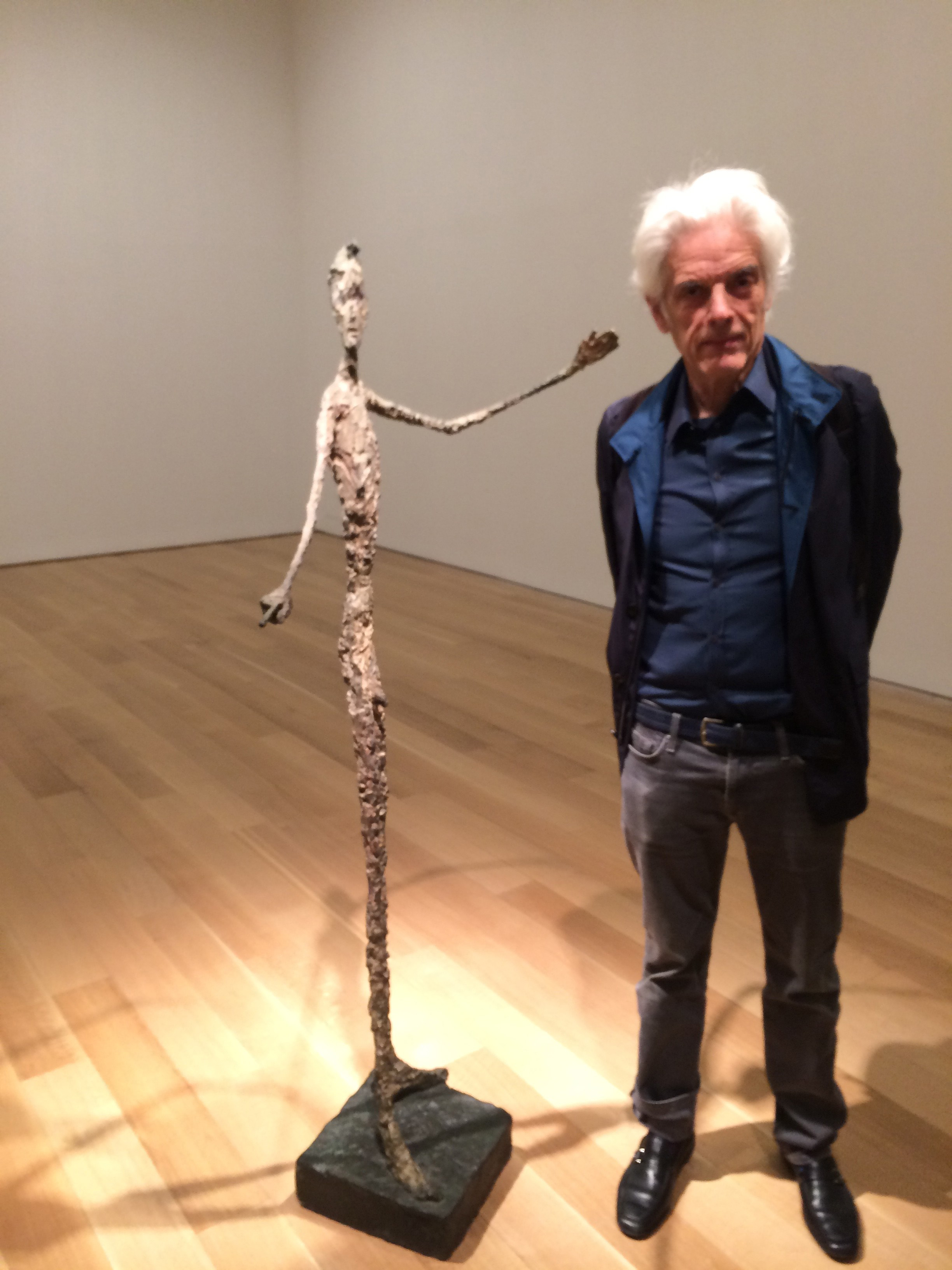
- Judd Tully with the hand-painted Alberto Giacometti bronze, "Pointing Man" from 1947 at Christie's New York 2015.
- Born: Chicago, Illinois, USA
- Occupations: Journalist, author, art critic
- Writing career
- Period: 1970s–present

Judd Tully is an American art critic and journalist who writes about artists and the art market. He has been contributor to BlouinARTINFO, The Washington Post, ARTnews, Flash Art and covered topics such as the potential indictment of museum staff in response to Robert Mapplethorpe's 1990 retrospective, and some of the first post-war multi-million dollar auction records. He is formerly the editor-at-large for the website Blouin Artinfo. He has also appeared on CNBC and MSNBC.

== Biography ==
Judd Tully was born Judd Goldstein in Chicago and attended Lake View High School. He also attended American University in Washington, DC and went on to pursue a masters at the University of Oregon. He initially got his start writing for underground newspapers and journals in the Bay Area such as the Berkeley Barb. When Tully moved to New York City around 1972 he began to write freelance art reviews for publications such as the New Art Examiner, Flash Art and SoHo Weekly News, eventually becoming a stringer for The Washington Post in 1985. Tully also serves as the Chairman of the Reuben Kadish Foundation. In June 2022, a feature-length documentary film about David Hammons, directed by both Tully and Harold Crooks, premiered at the 2022 Sheffield DocFest.
