= African American Flag =

African American Flag may refer to:

- Black American Heritage Flag, the ethnic flag of the African American people
- Pan-African flag, which represents pan-Africanism, the African diaspora, and/or black nationalism
- African-American Flag, a 1990 vexillographic artwork by David Hammons
