= Independence Monument (Togo) =

Monument in Lomé, Togo

Coordinates: 6.130°N 1.216°E

- Monument de l'Indépendance (French)
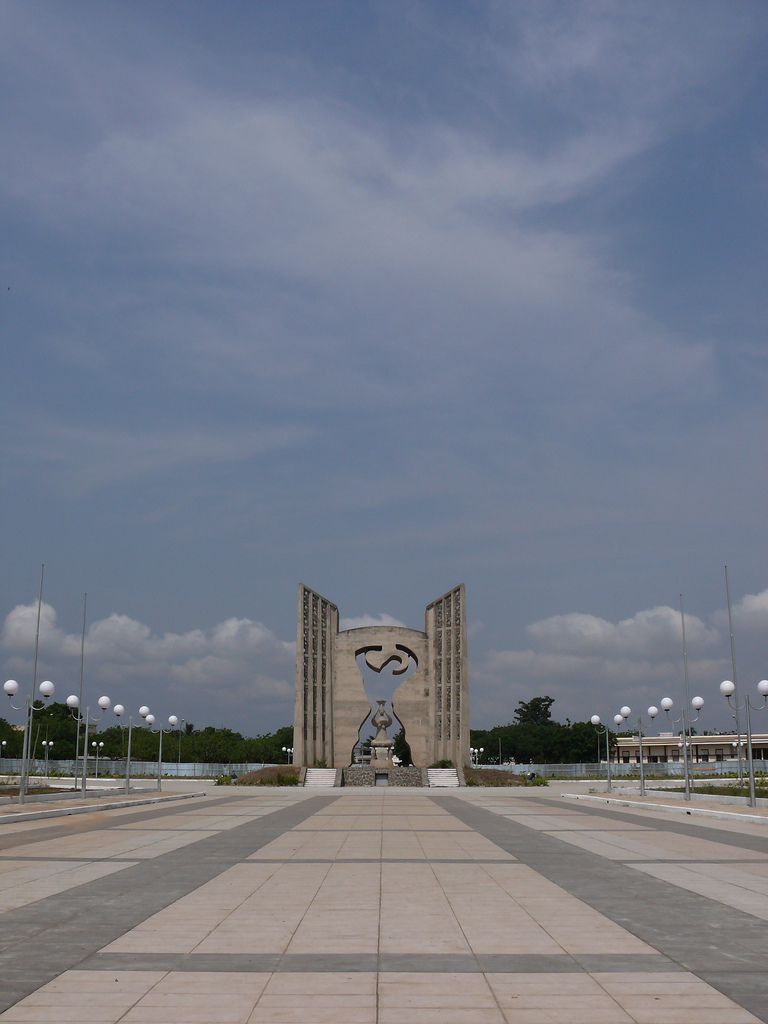
- Designer: Paul Ahyi (contributor)

The Independence Monument (French: Monument de l'Indépendance) in Lomé, the capital of Togo, was built as a tribute to the country's independence from France on 27 April 1960. It features a white bust of a woman holding up a cooking pot, in front of a silhouette of a figure holding up their arms as if they were breaking chains that shackled them together. The sides of the silhouette bear a number of inscriptions, including one which says in French: "People of Togo, because of your faith and sacrifice, the Togolese nation was born." Another side bears the national motto and the following inscription: "Proclamation of the independence of Togo, 27 April 1960. Work, Liberty, Homeland." It is located near the Palais des congrès de Lomé, which houses the Togo National Museum. Paul Ahyi, a renowned Togolese artist who designed the country's national flag, was a contributor to the monument.

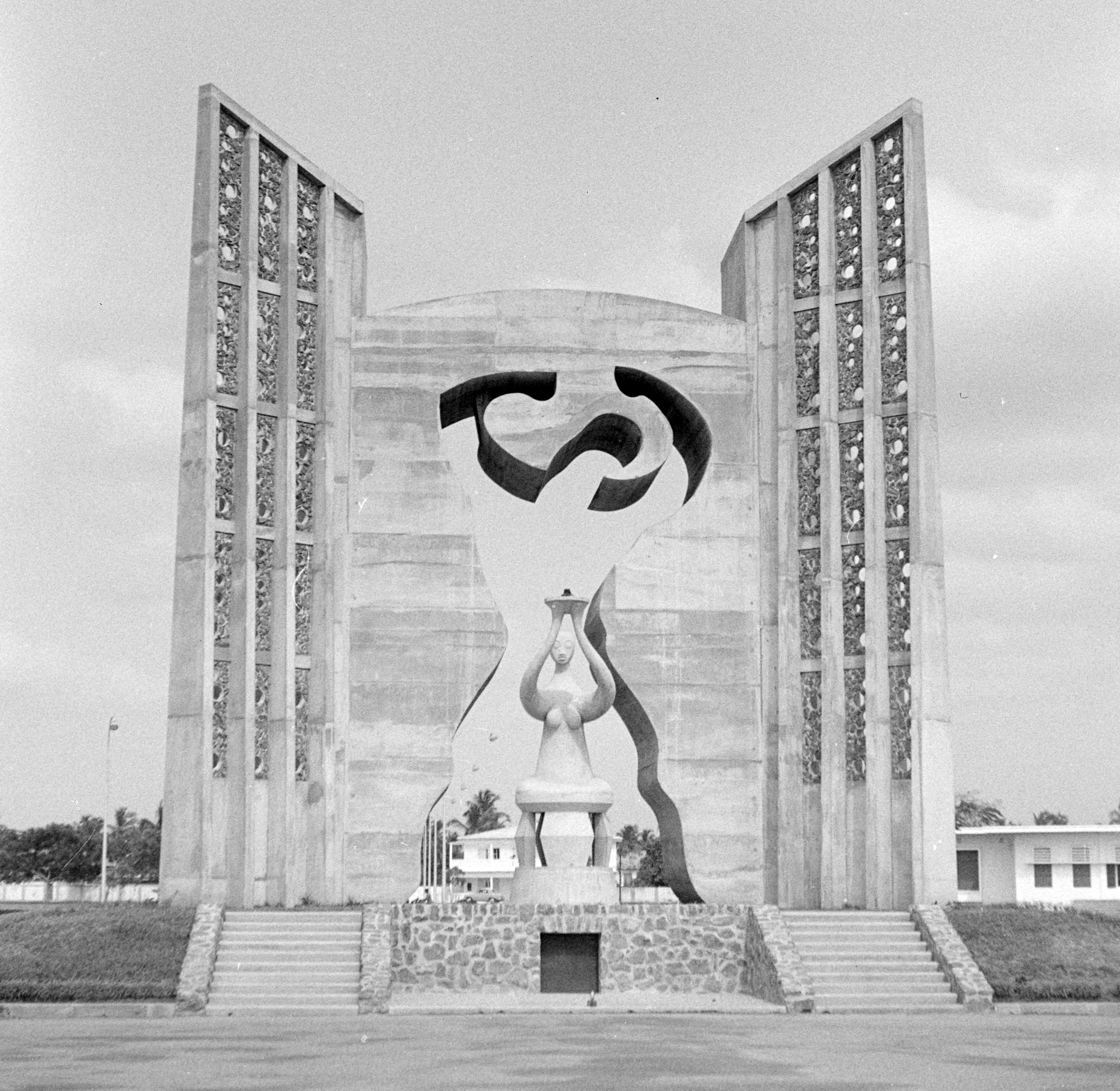
The Independence Monument in 1962

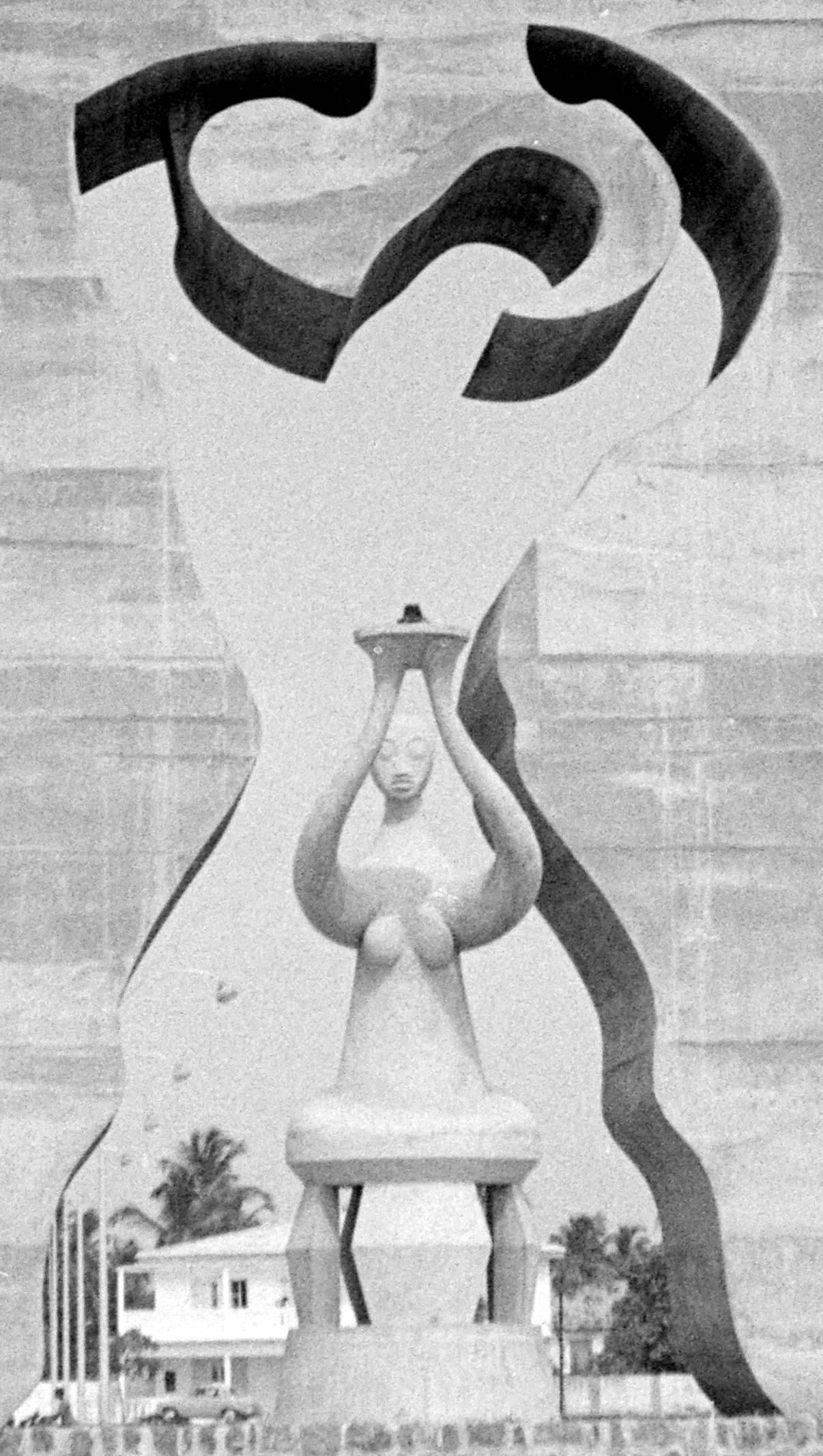
Closer view of the bust and silhouette from the previous photo

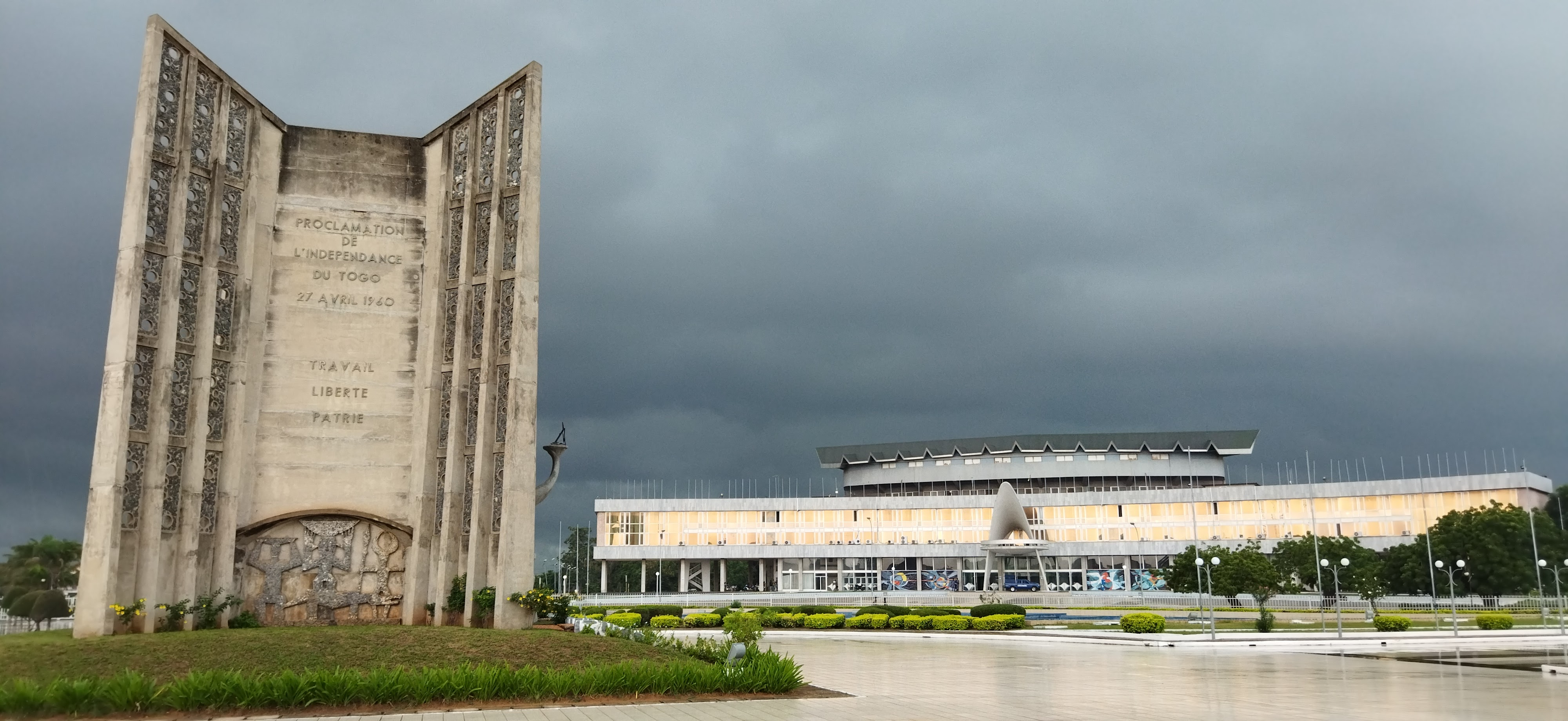
Side view of the Independence Monument with the Palais des congrès de Lomé on the right
