= Paul Ahyi =

Togolese artist (1930–2010)

Paul Ahyi (January 15, 1930 – January 4, 2010) was a Togolese artist, sculptor, architect, painter, interior designer and author. Ahyi is credited with designing of the flag of Togo.

Ahyi was known for his massive outdoor artworks, reliefs and sculptures, including his contributions to the Independence Monument in Lomé, which commemorates the country's independence from France. Other outdoor sculptures and statues by Ahyi can be found on buildings and in parks throughout Togo, as well as the Vatican, Senegal, Benin, Côte d'Ivoire, Nigeria and South Korea.

He also created his pieces using a wide array of mediums including jewelry, pottery, ceramics and tapestries. He was also an interior designer who created household objects and art pieces.

== Biography ==
Paul Ahyi was born to Togolese parents on January 15, 1930, in Abomey, French Dahomey. Ahyi attended school in Dakar, Senegal, from 1949 until 1952. He moved to France, where he enrolled in the Fine Art School of Lyon beginning in 1952. He graduated from the École nationale supérieure des Beaux-Arts in Paris in 1959 and returned to Togo, which was called French Togoland prior to independence.

Ahyi designed the flag of Togo.

Ahyi was commissioned to design the flag of the new nation of Togo, which achieved independence from France on April 27, 1960. His finished design, which was unveiled in 1960, is still used by the country. Ahyi used the Pan-African colours of red, yellow and green in his flag, which was modeled from the flag of Liberia using horizontal stripes. The red square symbolized bloodshed in the struggle for independence. The flag's yellow represented the soil, while green symbolizes Togo's forests and agriculture. Ahyi added a white star, similar to the Liberian flag, representing light, intelligence and peace.

He also contributed to another important Togolese national symbol, the Independence Monument which was constructed in the center of Lomé.

Ahyi's reliefs and sculptures have been installed and displayed at the United Nations in New York City, as well as Canada, South Korea, West Africa, Italy, Japan, and Paris, France. He taught art and architecture throughout Africa during his career.

He authored several books, many focusing on the arts and his native Togo, including "Togo, mon cœur saigne" and "La réflexion sur l'art et la culture".

=== Awards ===
Ahyi received numerous awards, honors and recognitions through his career. In 1961, he was bestowed the Médaille d'Or des Métiers d'Arts in Paris. Ahyi was made an Officer of the Ordre du Mono in Togo in 1970. He was inducted as a Commander of the Ordre des Palmes Académiques in 1985 and an Officer of the Ordre des Arts et des Lettres, also in 1985.

Ahyi was designated a UNESCO Artist for Peace in a ceremony held in Paris on September 10, 2009. Former UNESCO Director-General Koichiro Matsuura honored Ahyi for his "contribution to the promotion of UNESCO's ideals through his artistic activities."

=== Death and legacy ===
Paul Ahyi died on Monday, January 4, 2010, in Lomé, at the age of 79. Irina Bokova, the director-general of UNESCO, called Ahyi's death, "a great loss for Togo and Africa and also for UNESCO, which had appointed him as one of its advocates for peace and social cohesion." Ahyi's daughter married a man from Senegal and their daughter Caroline Gueye was also an artist.
