= Cherokee flag (disambiguation) =

Cherokee flag may refer to any of several flags associated with groups within the Cherokee Native American tribe. These include

- the Flag of the Cherokee Nation (Oklahoma)
- the Flag of the United Keetoowah Band of Cherokee Indians (Oklahoma)
- the Flag of the Eastern Band of the Cherokee nation (North Carolina).
