= List of Togolese flags =

Overview of Togolese flags

The following is a list of flags used in Togo. For more information about the national flag, see flag of Togo.

== National flag ==
Flag	Date	Use	Description
	1960–present	Flag of Togo	Five equal horizontal bands of green (top and bottom) alternating with yellow; with a red canton bearing a white five-pointed star.

== Government flags ==
Flag	Date	Use	Description
	1960–present	Presidential flag of Togo	Five equal horizontal bands of green (top and bottom) alternating with yellow; with a red canton bearing a white five-pointed star surrounded by laurels.
	1974–2005	Presidential standard of Gnassingbé Eyadéma	Five equal horizontal bands of green (top and bottom) alternating with yellow; with a red canton bearing a white five-pointed star and yellow script reading "GE" surrounded by laurels.

=== Togoland Protectorate ===
Flag	Date	Use	Description
	1884–1916	Flag of the Imperial Colonial Office	A tricolor made of three equal horizontal bands coloured black (top), white, and red (bottom) defaced with the Reichsadler in the centre.

== Ethnic group flags ==
Flag	Date	Use	Description
	?–present	Flag of the Ewe people (32% of the total population of Togo)	A horizontal triband of green, red, and green, charged with three yellow stars on the central band. Used unofficially to represent the Ewe people.
	?–present	Flag of the Hausa people (<1% of the total population of Togo)	A white field with a Dagin Arewa in the center. Used unofficially to represent the Hausa people.

== Historical flags ==
Flag	Years of use	Ratio	Government	Description
	1884–1914	2:3	Togoland Protectorate	The flag of the German Empire was used as the official flag of German Togoland.
	1916–1957	2:3	Territory of Togoland	The French tricolor was used as the official flag of French Togoland and, from 1955, the Autonomous Republic of Togo.
	1957–1958	3:5	Autonomous Republic of Togo	A new flag for Togo was introduced in 1957, consisting of a green field with a French flag in the canton and two five-pointed white stars, one on the lower hoist side and one on the upper fly side.
	1958–1960	3:5	Autonomous Republic of Togo	The French flag in the canton of the previous flag was removed in 1958.
	1960–present	1:φ	Togolese Republic	The current flag of Togo was introduced upon gaining independence from France on 27 April 1960. It consists of five equal horizontal bands of green (top and bottom) alternating with yellow; with a red canton bearing a white five-pointed star.

== Proposed flag ==
Flag	Date	Use	Description
	1914	Proposed flag of the Togoland Protectorate	A tricolor made of three equal horizontal bands coloured black (top), white, and red (bottom) defaced with a proposed coat of arms in the center.

== See also ==
- Coat of arms of Togo
- Flag of Togo
