= Pan-African flag =

Flag using the Pan-African colours

- Various other names
- Use: Africans and Afro Caribbean/Americans
- Adopted: 13 August 1920
- Design: A horizontal triband of red, black, and green
- Designed by: Marcus Garvey

The Pan-African flag, also known as the Black Liberation flag or UNIA flag, and various other names is an ethnic flag representing Pan-Africanism, all peoples of Indigenous African descent, and/or black nationalism. A tri-color flag, it consists of three equal horizontal bands of (from top down) red, black, and green. August 17 - the birthday of Marcus Garvey, is celebrated as Universal African Flag Day.

The flag was created as a response to racism against African Americans and because Marcus Garvey wanted to unify African Americans under a common flag. The colors and flag were inspired by the Liberty League of Negro Americans.

The Universal Negro Improvement Association and African Communities League (UNIA-ACL) formally adopted it on August 13, 1920, in Article 39 of the Declaration of the Rights of the Negro Peoples of the World, during its month-long convention at Madison Square Garden in New York City. Variations of the flag can and have been used in various countries and territories in the Americas to represent Garveyist ideologies.

Pan-African Flags follow two similar color sets:

- red, black, and green, inspired by the Black Liberation Flag;
- the second color set changes black to gold or yellow, to make the red, green, and gold color set.

These two color sets dominate the flags of the African Continent.

Flag of Ethiopia (1975–1987), using the second set of Pan African Flag colors

== History ==
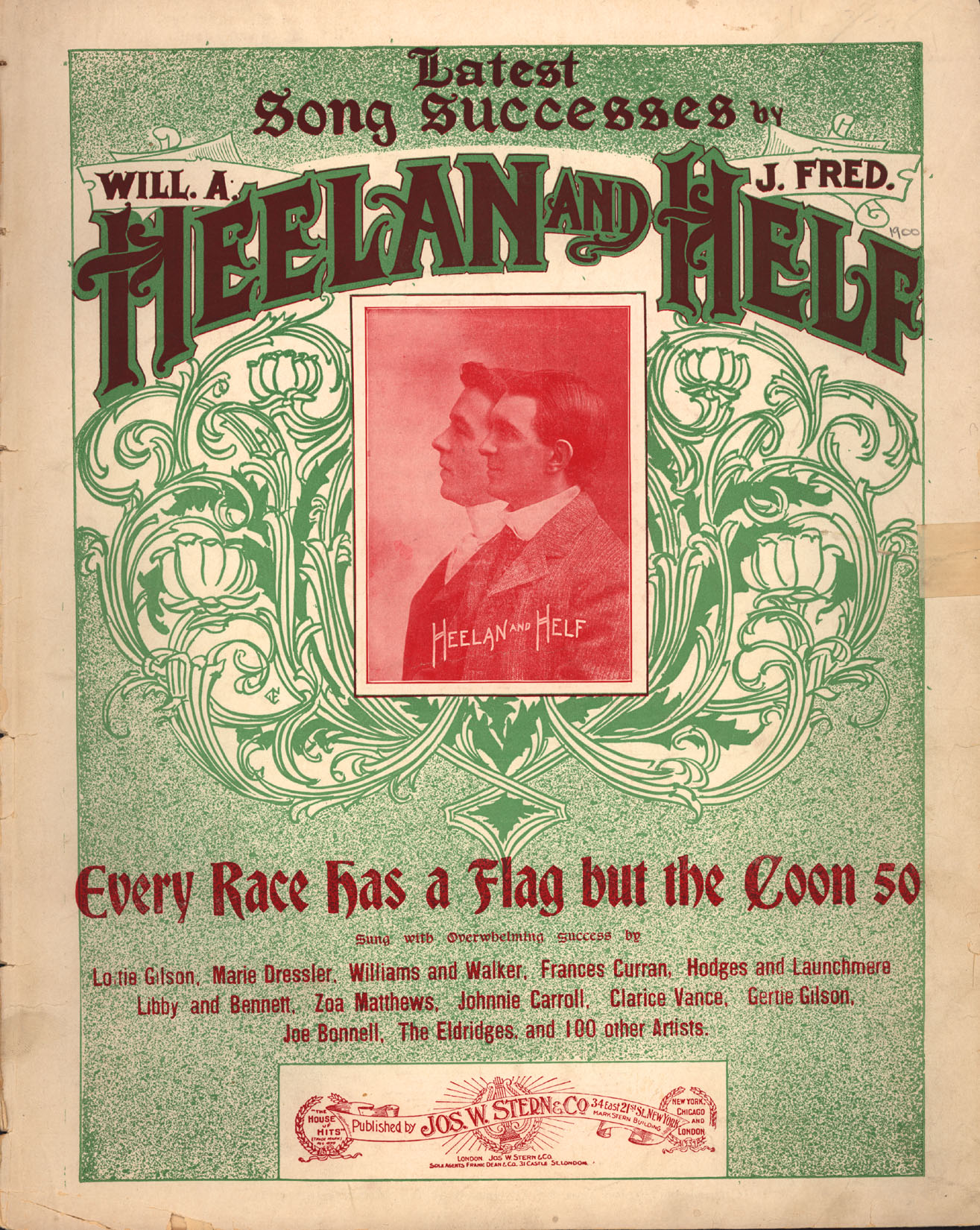
Sheet music for "Every Race Has a Flag but the Coon"

=== Liberty League of Negro Americans Flag Inspiration ===
Marcus Garvey wanted to create a flag to fight back and promote racial pride. He was inspired by the 1917 flag of The Liberty League of Negro-Americans whose perpendicular tri color flag was black, brown, and yellow. These three colors were meant to symbolize the colors of all the people from Africa in America, and their relationship to their own people and other peoples of the world. He would later use this as inspiration for his 1920 Black Liberation Flag, changing the colors to black, red, and gold. Then finally the black, red, and green.

The Flag of the Liberty League of Negro-Americans. It would inspire Marcus Garvey to create his UNIA flag.

=== UNIA Flag Creation ===
The Black Liberation Flag was inspired by the Liberty League's flag, and in 1920 the UNIA created theirs because they wanted to unify the African American people in America and as a response "coon song" that became a hit around 1900, titled, "Every Race Has a Flag but the Coon". This song has been cited as one of the three songs that "firmly established the term coon in the American vocabulary". In a 1927 report of a 1921 speech appearing in the Negro World weekly newspaper, Marcus Garvey was quoted as saying:

Show me the race or the nation without a flag, and I will show you a race of people without any pride. Aye! In song and mimicry they have said, "Every race has a flag but the coon." How true! Aye! But that was said of us four years ago. They can't say it now. ...

The Universal Negro Catechism, published by the UNIA in 1921, refers to the colors of the flag meaning:

Red is the color of the blood which men must shed for their redemption and liberty; black is the color of the noble and distinguished race to which we belong; green is the color of the luxuriant vegetation of our Motherland.

When the UNIA-owned newspaper, the Negro World, held a competition in 1927 asking why its readers considered themselves "Garveyites," many entries, including the winning entries, said it was because the organization had a flag. The color red in many country flags is most often associated with bloodshed, which is also the symbolism used in the Pan African Flag by UNIA in 1920.

According to the UNIA more recently, the three colors on the Black Nationalist flag represent:

- red: the blood that unites all people of Black African ancestry, and shed for liberation;
- black: black people whose existence as a nation, though not a nation-state, is affirmed by the existence of the flag; and
- green: the abundant natural wealth of Africa.

The flag later became a Black Nationalist symbol for the worldwide liberation of Black people. As an emblem of Black pride, the flag became popular during the Black Liberation movement of the 1960s.

=== New Jersey School Board 1971-2026 ===
==== New Jersey School Board 2026 ====
In 1971, Lawrence Hamm, a seventeen year old Newark New Jersey school board member proposed a resolution to fly the Black Liberation Flag at schools and in classrooms as a teaching aid, at schools in Newark that were majority black. All five of the school boards members present approved this resolution that day, however four of the nine total school board members were absent at the time of voting. One of the absent school board members, who was white, took the board to court because he believed the resolution was illegal and unconstitutional. The school board member, John Cervase is quoted in saying,"(it) would deprive the public of tax‐supported schools free from propaganda and doctrine favoring a select racial or ethnic group, contrary to the public welfare." The Superior Court restrained the Newark School board's resolution. The same day as the restraining order on the resolution was signed, a bill in the New Jersey State Assembly was proposed and passed, restricting that no flag other than the flag of the United States of America can be flown on schools and government building and be put in classrooms.

==== New Jersey School Board 2016 ====
In February 2026, after 50 years since first proposed, the Newark School Board allowed schools to raise the Black Liberation Flag in classrooms and buildings.

=== Juneteenth ===
19 June 1865, is the date in which enslaved people in Galveston, Texas, finally received the news of their freedom. This is commemorated every 19 June with Juneteenth, which is considered the longest-running African American holiday. Many in the African American community have adopted the Pan-African flag to represent Juneteenth. The Juneteenth holiday became an official federal holiday 17 June 2021, and does have its own flag, however, created in 1997 – the Juneteenth flag.

=== 2010s usage ===
In the United States, following the refusal of a grand jury to indict a police officer in the August 9, 2014, shooting of Michael Brown in Ferguson, Missouri, a Howard University student replaced the U.S. flag on that school's Washington, D.C., campus flagpole with a "black solidarity" flag (this tricolor) flying at half-mast.

=== 2020s usage ===
In February 2023, the Pan-African flag was flown over the Denver Federal Center to commemorate Black History Month, which was the first time that flag was flown over any federal building. In Martinique, a new flag was raised which symbolises the same ties to Africa.

== Derivative flags ==
=== Flags of nation states ===
Flag of Kenya

Flag of South Sudan

Flag of Malawi

Flag of Malawi (2010–2012)

Flag of Biafra (1967–1970)

Proposed flag for Angola (1996)

Flag of Azawad

Flag of Martinique

A number of flags of nation states in Africa and the Caribbean have been inspired by the UNIA flag. The Biafran flag is another variant of the UNIA flag with a sunburst in the center. Designed by the Biafran government and first raised in 1967, the colors are directly based on Garvey's design.

The flag of Malawi issued in 1964 is very similar and reflects the Black Nationalist flag's order of stripes. It is not directly based on Garvey's flag, although the colors have the same symbolism: Red for blood symbolizing the struggle of the people, green for vegetation, and black for the race of the people.

The Kenyan flag (Swahili: Bendera ya Kenya) is a tricolor of black, red, and green with two white fimbriations imposed, with a Masai shield and two crossed spears. It was officially adopted on 12 December 1963 after Kenya's independence, inspired by the Pan-African tricolour.

The flag of Saint Kitts and Nevis has similar colors, arranged diagonally and separated by yellow lines. It similar to the Malawian flag in that the colors are not directly taken from the Pan-African flag but the symbolism is the same.

=== Derivative flags in the United States ===
==== The Kwanzaa Bendera ====
In the 1960s The Us Organization redesigned the UNIA flag also changing order and significance of the colours to: black, red and green. Defining "black" for the people, "red" for struggle, and "green" for the future built "out of struggle".

United States Postal Service issued a stamp in 1997 to commemorate the African-American festival of Kwanzaa with a painting by artist Synthia Saint James of a dark-skinned family wearing garments traditional in parts of Africa and fashionable for special occasions among African-Americans. The family members are holding food, gifts, and a flag. The flag in the stamp may have been meant to represent the Pan-African flag but instead used the similar flag (a black, red, and green horizontal tricolour) of the Black nationalist organisation Us Organization, which shares its founder, professor and activist Maulana Karenga, with Kwanzaa.

The bendera (flag in the Kiswahili language) was documented as an supplemental symbol of Kwanzaa, in Karenga's 1998 book The African American Holiday of Kwanzaa, and included in ceremonial use during the festival.

==== Artworks ====
In 1990, artist David Hammons created a work called African-American Flag, which is held by the Museum of Modern Art in New York City. Based on the standard U.S. flag, its stripes are black and red, the canton field is green, and the stars on the canton field are black.

David Hammons's African-American Flag

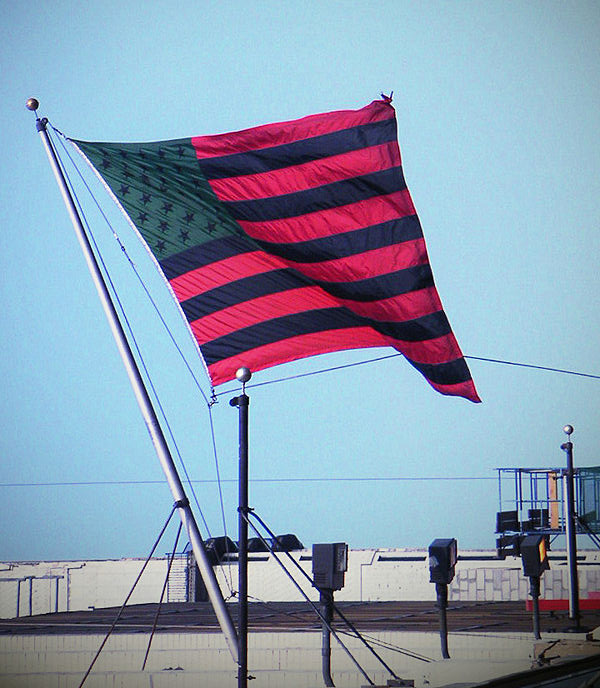
African American Flag in New York city

== Alternative names ==
The flag goes by several other names with varying degrees of popularity:

- the Afro-American flag
- the Bendera Ya Taifa (Kiswahili for "flag of the Nation"), in reference to its usage during Kwanzaa
- the Black Liberation flag
- the International African flag
- the Marcus Garvey flag
- the UNIA flag, after its originators
- the Universal African flag
- the Red Black Green (RBG) flag
- the Black Nationalist flag

== Proposed holiday ==
In 1999, an article appeared in the July 25 edition of The Black World Today suggesting that, as an act of global solidarity, every August 17 should be celebrated worldwide as Universal African Flag Day by flying the red, black, and green banner. August 17 is the birthday of Marcus Garvey.

== See also ==
- Black Nationalism
- Ethnic flag
- Flags of Africa
- Juneteenth flag
- Marcus Garvey
- Hubert Harrison
- Pan-Africanism
- Pan-African colours: Red, gold and green (Ethiopian)
- Flag of Ethiopia
- Flag of South Sudan
- Flag of Kenya
- Flag of Saint Kitts and Nevis
- Flag of Malawi
- Black American Heritage Flag
- Pan-African Flags
