= Ethnic flag =

Flag used to represent an ethnicity

An ethnic flag is a flag that symbolizes a certain ethnic group. Ethnic flags are often introduced to the ethnic community through the respective cultural or political ethnic movements. They are popular among diasporas, ethnic minorities, and some ethnic majorities, especially in multiethnic countries.

== History ==
Like the concept of a state's national flag itself, that of an "ethnic flag" is modern, first arising in the late 19th century; strictly speaking, the national flags of nation states are themselves "ethnic flags", and often so used by ethnic minorities in neighboring states, especially in the context of irredentism (e.g. the flag of the Republic of Albania used as an "ethnic Albanian flag" by Kosovar Albanians).

Ethnic flags are often used in irredentism, representing the "national flag" of a proposed or unrecognized state. The first such flags were designed at the end of the 19th century, such as the Basque flag (1894) or the "Flag of Zion" used to symbolize Zionism from 1898, which became the national flag of Israel 50 years later.

Most early ethnic flags imply a connection with an unrecognized state claimed by the respective ethnicities, such as the flag of Kurdistan which originates as the flag of the Republic of Ararat (1927). A flag of the Hispanic People was designed in 1932.

Alternatively, an "ethnic flag" may represent a Pan-nationalism, such as the Pan-Arab flag which originates as the flag of the Arab Revolt during World War I, the proposed flag of Pan-Slavism (1848), Pan-Iranism or Pan-Turkism.

The concept of using ethnic flags to symbolize ethnic groups within a multiethnic state, not necessarily connected with irredentism, became popular in the later 20th century, such as the Australian Aboriginal flag (1971), the Assyrian flag (1971), the flag of the Romani people (1971), the Berber flag (1970s), the Sami flag (1986) or the national Māori flag (1990). Designing ethnic or tribal flags has become very popular since the 1990s, especially for online use, and mostly do not have any kind of "official" status and must be judged based on de facto use. In many cases, the national flag of a sovereign state is often seen and used as a de facto ethnic flag by its people.

== Individual flags ==
- Media related to Cultural flags at Wikimedia Commons
  - Media related to Flags of ethnic groups at Wikimedia Commons
  - Media related to Flags of active autonomist and secessionist movements at Wikimedia Commons
  - Media related to Native American flags in Latin America at Wikimedia Commons
  - Media related to Native American flags in the United States at Wikimedia Commons

Image	Name	Group	World region	Linguistic phylum	Introduction	Notes
	Flag of England	English	Europe, North	Indo-European, Germanic, English	1190s	The red cross of Saint George has been an English national symbol since the late 12th century, used by English soldiers during the Catholic-sponsored crusades.
	Flag of Sicily	Sicilians	Europe, South	Indo-European, Romance, Sicilian	1282	A modernized version of the flag, adopted in 2000, adds wheat ears and reverses the colors.
	Flag of Scotland	Scottish	Europe, North	Indo-European, Celtic, Scottish Gaelic	1385	The white saltire has been a national symbol since 1385 when the Parliament of Scotland ordered that Scottish soldiers should wear it as a distinguishing mark.
	Alam Peudeuëng	Acehnese	Asia, Indonesia	Austronesian, Acehnese	1400s–1500s	Adopted by the Aceh Sultanate, it continues to be used by the Acehnese as a cultural and hereditary symbol. The current modern rendition is based on a design from 1961.
	Flag of the Mapuches	Mapuche people	America, South	Araucanian, Mapudungun	1506	As used during the Arauco War between the Mapuche and the Spaniards, it was a simple blue field with a white Guñelve star centered, representing the Morning Star.
	Bhagwa Dhwaj	Hindu Nationalism/Hindutva and Marathi	Indian subcontinent	Indo-Aryan, Dravidian	1674	Specific design was first used by the Maratha Empire, and currently used by the Rashtriya Swayamsevak Sangh. Similar saffron-coloured designs also used by the Sikh Khalsa.
	A bandera Corsa	Corsicans	Europe, West	Indo-European, Romance, Corsican	1755	From an older tradition, but with uncertain origins, this banner was officially adopted by the Corsican Republic of Pasquale Paoli.
	Métis flag	Métis people	America, North	mixed; Michif	1814	Received from Alexander Macdonnell of the North West Company in 1814 and used by the Canadian Métis resistance in the Battle of Seven Oaks (1816).
	Circassian Flag	Circassians	Europe, Caucasus	Northwest Caucasian, Adyghe	1830; 1992	Used by Circassians since the 19th century and Adygea since 1992.
	Flag of Cornwall	Cornish	Europe, North	Indo-European, Celtic, Brittonic, Cornish	1838	The earliest known evidence of this flag was recorded by Davies Gilbert in 1838, but he implied that he believed it to be used before then. However, Gilbert did not leave a record of his background research.
	Flag of Hawaii	Native Hawaiians	Polynesia	Austronesian, Hawaiian	1845	Adopted by the Kingdom of Hawaii, and continued to be used by the protectorate, republic, and territory before statehood. The flag was last modified in 1898, and is noteworthy as still being used after the 1893 overthrow of the Hawaiian Kingdom.
	Flag of the Slovene Nation	Slovenes	Europe, Central	Indo-European, Slavic, Slovene	1848	The design originates from the flag of Duchy of Carniola, the most slovenian land of the Austrian Empire. The Slovene flag was first flown on April 7 1848 by Lovro Toman.
	Flag of Ireland	Irish	Europe, North	Indo-European, Celtic, Irish Gaelic	1848	Thomas Francis Meagher commented in 1848: "The white in the centre signifies a lasting truce between Orange and Green and I trust that beneath its folds the hands of Irish Protestants and Irish Catholics may be clasped in generous and heroic brotherhood." It was confirmed as the National Flag in 1937.
	Pan-Slavic colours	Slavs	Europe, Eastern	Indo-European, Slavic languages	1848	Adopted by the Prague Slavic Congress, 1848, used as the ethnic flag of Sorbs, Moravians, and other Slavic-speaking minorities.
	The Yoonir star is a symbol of Serer religion and the Serer people.	The Serer people of the Senegambia region, including Senegal, Gambia, and Mauritania	Africa, West	Niger Congo, Senegambian, Serer, and Cangin.	From its roots as a Serer religious symbol in Serer primordial time, it was adopted in the 1850s as a flag and as an ethno nationalistic symbol in Sine.	Yoonir or Yooniir, in their language, symbolizes the universe and the cardinal points in the Serer creation myth and religion, and also represents the star Sirius. Amongst the Serer, it has always been a religious symbol rather than an ethno nationalistic symbol which came much later in the second half of the 19th century, and it is the Serer religious symbol that is showcased by the Serer priestly class (the Saltigue) on the last day of the annual Xooy religious ceremony - in reverence to Serer primordial time. During the colonial era of Senegal in particular, it was common for Serer nobles who could not read or write in French to sign their names on official documents with Yoonir—as it also symbolizes 'good fortune and destiny' in the Serer-worldview. In c. 1850s, during the reign of King of Sine, Kumba Ndoffene Famak Joof, the King of Sine adopted a plain black star version of it, set in a white backgrounds as the flag of Sine. The white colour was meant to symbolize peace.
	Flag of the Choctaw Nation	Choctaw people	America, North	Muskhogean, Western, Choctaw	1860	Adopted in 1860 before the United States Civil War, becoming the first Native American tribe to adopt a flag. The flag would be altered by the Tribal Council in the 1970s to its present form.
	Flag of Tonga	Tongans	Polynesia	Austronesian, Tongan	1875	The only ethnically Polynesian nation to never relinquish its sovereignty to any foreign power. The constitution states the flag can never be changed.
	Flag of Acadia	Acadians	America, North	Indo-European, Romance, French	1884	Adopted at the Second Acadian National Convention held in Miscouche, Prince Edward Island, on 15 August 1884.
	Flag of Galicia	Galicians	Europe, West	Indo-European, Romance, Galician	1891	Adopted as a maritime flag in 1891, it origninally depicted the St Andrew's Cross; however, due to confusion with the flag of the Imperial Russian Navy, it was decided to drop one of the arms of the cross.
	Ikurriña	Basque people	Europe, West	Basque	1895	Designed in 1894 for the province of Biscay, adopted in 1895 by "Euzkeldun Batzokija" (predecessor of the Basque Nationalist Party), adopted it as the flag of the Basque Autonomous Region in 1936, prohibited in Francoist Spain 1938–1977, official adoption as the flag of the Basque Country in 1978.
	Flag of Zion	Jews	Asia, Western	Afro-Asiatic, Semitic, Hebrew	1898	Introduced as the flag of Zionism at the Second Zionist Congress held in Switzerland in 1898; adopted as the state flag of Israel in 1948.
	Flag of Tibet	Tibetans	Asia	Tibetic	1916	
	Flag of the Arab Revolt	Arabs	Asia, Northern Africa	Afro-Asiatic, Semitic, Arabic	1917	Introduced as the flag of the Arab nationalist revolt against the Ottoman Empire and the Kingdom of Hejaz in 1917. It became the basis of a number of flags using the Pan-Arab colors later in the 20th century.
	Crimean Tatar flag	Crimean Tatars	Europe, Eastern	Turkic, Crimean Tatar	1917	Introduced under the Crimean People's Republic (November 1917), now used as ethnic flag.
	Flag of Armenia	Armenians	Europe, Western Asia	Indo-European, Armenian	1918	The Armenian Supreme Soviet adopted the current flag on 24 August 1990. On 15 June 2006, the Law on the National Flag of Armenia, governing its usage, was passed by the National Assembly of Armenia.
	Senyera	Catalans	Europe, West	Indo-European, Romance, Catalan	1918	The flag was designed in 1918 by Vicenç Albert Ballester i Camps. It came from combining the traditional four red stripes over a yellow field of the Catalan Senyera with a blue triangle at the hoist containing a five-pointed white star, inspired by the flags of Cuba, the Philippines and Puerto Rico; the lone star motif symbolizes Catalan independence.
	Flag of Upper Silesia	Silesians	Europe, Central	Silesian	1919	Similar to the former flag of the Province of Upper Silesia. A popular symbol of the Movement for Silesian Autonomy.
	Pan-African flag	Black People	Black diaspora	English, African-American Vernacular English	1920	Adopted in 1920 by the Universal Negro Improvement Association and African Communities League, now used in black nationalism and Pan-Africanism.
	Flag of the Swedish-speaking Finns	Finland-Swedes	Europe, North	Indo-European, Germanic, Swedish	1922	Used by the Swedish People's Party of Finland from 1922, based on a 1917 design.
	Flag of Livonians	Livonians	Europe, North	Finnic, Livonian	1923	Used by Livonian Society (Līvõd Īt) in 1923.
	Flag of New Mexico	Neomexicanos	America, North	Indo-European, Romance, Spanish	1925	
	Flag of Oklahoma	Okies	America, North	Indo-European, Germanic, English	1925	
	Flag of the Kurds	Kurds, Kurdish nationalism	Asia, Western	Indo-European, Indo-Iranian, Iranian, Kurdish	1927	Used by the Republic of Ararat in 1927, based on earlier designs used in the 1890s revolt.
	Flag of the Korean National Association	Koreans	Asia, Eastern	Korean	1928	Designed by Yong-man Park. According to Brian Reynolds Myers, due to the inherently ethnic nature of Korean nationalism, the South Korean flag is also seen and used as a de facto pan-Korean ethnic flag by many South Koreans.
	Hispanic flag	Hispanidad, La Raza	Americas	Indo-European, Romance, Spanish	1932	Winning entry in a contest organized by Juana de Ibarbourou in 1932.
	Flag of the Romani people	Romani people	Europe	Indo-European, Indo-Iranian, Indo-Aryan, Romani	1933	Introduced by the General Union of the Roma of Romania in 1933, adopted at the First World Romani Congress in 1971.
	Flag of East Turkestan	Uyghurs	Asia	Turkic	1934	
	Malay tricolour	Malay people, Malayness	Asia, Southeast	Austronesian, Malay	1946	Introduced by the United Malays National Organisation (1946).
	Fleurdelisé	Québécois people	America, North	Indo-European, Romance, French, Quebec French	1948	Adopted by the government of Quebec during the administration of Maurice Duplessis.
	Druze flag	Druze	Levant, West Asia	Semitic	1948	Adopted by the Druze Mental Chiefdom based on "Five Limits Star Druze Star.
	Flag of the Danube Swabians	Danube Swabian	Europe	Germanic	1950	A coat of arms designed in 1950 by Hans Diplich has been adopted by many Danube Swabian cultural organizations. Its blazon is "Parti per fess wavy 1 Or, an eagle displayed couped Sable langued Gules; 2 parti per fess Argent and Vert, a fortress Argent roofed and turreted Gules surmounted with Sun and Crescent waning Or; chief wavy Azure".
	Flag of Somalia	Somalis	Africa, Horn	Somali	1954	Used by the Somali Republic after independence from the UK and Italy, Blue field with the Star of Unity
	Flag of Nagaland	Nagas	Asia, NE India, NW Myanmar	Tibeto-Burman	1956	First used by the Naga National Council. Blue field with the Star of Bethlehem and a simplified rainbow.
	Flag of Occitania	Occitans	Europe, West	Indo-European, Romance, Occitan	1959	Inspired by the historic flag of the County of Toulouse, the modern rendition which included the seven-point star was designed by the Occitan Nationalist Party.
	Flag of Wales	Welsh	Europe, North	Indo-European, Celtic, Brittonic, Welsh	1959	Green and white are the colours of the Tudor dynasty, and the Welsh Dragon is an ancient symbol of Celtic Britons. The current design was officially adopted in 1959.
	Flag of the Hausa people, Hausa–Fulani	Hausa, Hausa Kingdoms	Africa; West, East, and Central	Hausa language Afro-Asiatic language	1960	Hausa Emblem Flag, traditionally established emblem of Hausa identity – the 'Dagin Arewa' or 'Northern knot' – in a star shape, used in historic and traditional architecture, design and hand-embroidery.
	Flag of the Oglala Sioux Nation	Oglala Lakota	America, North	Siouan, Teton Sioux	1961	The circle of eight teepees on the flag represent the nine districts of the reservation: Porcupine, Wakpamni, Medicine Root, Pass Creek, Eagle Nest, White Clay, LaCreek, Wounded Knee, and Pine Ridge. The red field represents the blood shed by the tribe in defense of their lands.
	Flag of Tsėhéstáno	Notameohmésêhese	America, North	Algic, Plains Algonquian	1964	The decorative glyph of the Morning Star, a traditional icon of Cheyenne art, centered on a light blue field, represents the Northern Cheyenne.
	Black American Heritage Flag	Black Americans	America, North	English, African-American Vernacular English, Tutnese, Gullah	1967	Created in 1967 by Melvin Charles and Gleason T. Jackson who conceived of it as a parade flag for Black Americans. The color red represents blood shed by Black Americans seeking freedom and equality in America, black represents pride in black people, and gold represents intellect, prosperity, and peace.
	Flag of Biafra	Igbo people	Africa, West	Niger-Congo, Igbo	1967	Flag of the irredentist Republic of Biafra, after 1970 used as ethnic flag.
	Flag of the Navajo Nation	Navajo people	America, North	Na-Dene, Southern Athabaskan, Navajo	1968	
	Assyrian flag	Assyrian people	Asia, Western	Afro-Asiatic, Semitic, Aramaic	1971	A 1968 design adopted by the Assyrian Universal Alliance in 1971.
	Australian Aboriginal flag	Aboriginal Australians	Australia	Australian	1971	Designed in 1971, given official recognition by the Australian authorities in 1995.
	Flag of Acadiana	Cajuns	America, North	—	1974	
	Flag of the Cherokee Nation	Cherokee people	America, North	Iroquoian, Cherokee	1978	The seven-pointed stars represent the seven clans of the Cherokees, while the black star represents those lost on the Trail of Tears.
	Flag of the Haudenosaunee Confederacy	Haudenosaunee (Iroquois)	America, North	Iroquoian	1980s	Based on the Hiawatha Belt, the four squares and one tree represent the original five nations of the Confederacy, and the tree also represents the Tree of Peace.
	Aramean-Syriac flag	Arameans/Assyrians	Asia, Western	Afro-Asiatic, Semitic, Aramaic	1980	Used by the Bahro Suryoyo journal in 1980.
	Sami flag	Sami people	Europe, Northern	Finnic, Sami	1986	Adopted by the 13th Nordic Sami Conference on 15 August 1986.
	Louisiana Creole flag	Louisiana Creoles	America, North	Afro-Creole	1987	
	Flag of Greenland	Greenlandic Inuit	Arctic	Greenlandic	1989	The only national flag of a Nordic country or territory without a Nordic Cross.
	National Māori flag	Māori people	Oceania, New Zealand	Austronesian, Maori	1990	Designed in 1990 and made the subject of an activist campaign until its official recognition by New Zealand authorities in 2009.
	Flag of Artsakh	Artsakhi Armenians	Europe, Western Asia	Armenian	1992	The tricolor design comes from the original Armenian flag, while the white pattern represents the mountains of Artsakh, and also forms an arrow pointing westward to symbolize the aspiration for eventual union with Armenia.
	Flag of the Republic of Bosnia and Herzegovina	Bosniaks	Europe, South	Bosnian	1992	Formerly the national flag of Bosnia and Herzegovina until 1998.
	Torres Strait Islander Flag	Torres Strait Islanders	Australia	Creole, Torres Strait Island	1992	Recognised by the Aboriginal and Torres Strait Islander Commission in June 1992, granted official status Australia in 1995.
	Flag of the Croatian Republic of Herzeg-Bosnia	Bosnian Croats	Europe, South	Serbo-Croatian, Croatian	1992	Formerly the flag of the Croatian Republic of Herzeg-Bosnia from 1992 to 1996.
	Flag of Merina people	Merina people	Africa, Madagascar	Austronesian, Malagasy	1997	Since 1997.
	Berber flag	Berbers	Africa, North	Afro-Asiatic, Berber	1998	Adopted by the World Amazigh Congress based on 1970s proposals by the Berber Academy.
	Flag of the Székelys	Székelys	Europe	Uralic, Hungarian	2004	Designed by Ádám Kónya and adopted by the Szekler National Council in 2004.
	Flag of Serbs of Croatia	Serbs of Croatia	Europe	Serbo-Croatian, Serbian	2005 (1997 in eastern Croatia)	Adopted by the Serb National Council (2005) and the Joint Council of Municipalities (1997)
	Flag of Rapa Nui	Rapa Nui people	Polynesia	Austronesian, Rapanui	2006	A similar flag was used from the 13th century until 1899 during its period of independence.
	Tornedalian Flag	Tornedalians	Europe, Northern	Finnic	2007	
	Flag of the Iraqi Turkmen	Iraqi Turkmen/Turkmeneli	Asia	Turkic	2007	This flag, with a white star and crescent and two white horizontal stripes on a light blue background, was first adopted as Flag of Iraqi National Turkmen Party in 2007, a constituent political party of the Iraqi Turkmen Front.
	Andean Wiphala	Aymara people (Indigenous Bolivians)	America, South	Aymaran; Quechuan	2009	Article 6, section II of the Constitution of Bolivia established the southern Qullasuyu Wiphala as the dual flag of Bolivia.
	Flag of the Csángós	Csángós	Europe	Uralic, Hungarian	2019	Donated by the Transylvanian Heraldic and Vexillological Association and adopted by the Csango Council on July 20, 2019.
	Flag of the Aromanians	Aromanians	Europe, Balkans	Aromanian	Unknown	Variations of this flag exist according to the country in which the Aromanians are located.
	Bonang Manalu	Batak	Asia, Indonesia	Austronesian, Batak	Unknown	The three colours has great significance within Batak traditions, the specific order shown in the flag represents the tiers of worlds according to Batak mythology as well as the day cycle.

== See also ==
- List of former sovereign states
- Flags of subnational entities
- Flags of unrecognized states
- Flags of micronations
