= Caroline Gueye =

Senegalese artist and scientist

- in 2026
- Born: c.1987 Dakar
- Education: France, America and China
- Occupation: artist
- Known for: scientist turned artist

Caroline Gueye (born c.1987) is a Senegalese artist and scientist. She studied science in France, America and China before deciding to concentrate on art. She won an award at the Dakar Biennale and in 2026 she represented her country at the Venice Biennale.

== Life ==
Gueye was born in Dakar in about 1987. Her maternal grandfather was the Togoese artist Paul Ahyi. He has been called "the African Picasso" and his works include the flag of his country.

She went to school in Senegal where she would create art in her spare time. When she was seventeen she went to France to complete her education. She studied physics in France, China and the US and she speaks Chinese.

In 2016 she had returned to the country of her birth. Her focus had changed from astrophysics to art. At the Dakar Biennale she exhibited her geometric paintings in an exhibition she titled Inflation Cosmique. She was awarded the ECOWAS Award for Best Artist in West Africa at the Dakar Biennale.

She was in Mauritania at Nouakchott's Sinaa Gallery in 2018 where she held another exhibition of her paintings. Her geometric pastels and inks were accompanied by a tapestry made of her work. The inspiration included the temperatures of stars as well as current events including the young girls kidnapped by Boko Haram.

In 2022 she had a residency in Houston which she felt was appropriate given the city's role in space exploration and her background in science.

Gueye in Geneva discussing "Is the IP System Fit for the Age of AI?"

In 2026 the World Intellectual Property Organization organised a meeting to discuss the readiness of IP to deal with the issues raised by artificial intelligence. Gueye was among the delegates invited to Geneva. She was one of the first visual artists to join the WIPO initiative “Creators Learn Intellectual Property” (CLIP) after it included artists. CLIP is intended to educate creators about their rights.

Gueye represented her country at the La Biennale di Venezia in 2026. Her exhibition's name translated as Gold. Her work was shown at the Palazzo Navagero where the interior of the building was part of her artwork.
