= Free Nelson Mandela (sculpture) =

Public artwork by David Hammons

Coordinates: 33.7824°N 84.3726°W

Free Nelson Mandela

Free Nelson Mandela is a sculpture in Atlanta, Georgia, USA, created by David Hammons in 1987. Alternatively referred to as a monument, the piece was originally created as a statement demanding the liberation of the imprisoned South African activist, Nelson Mandela. The official title is Nelson Mandela Must Be Free to Lead His People and South Africa to Peace and Prosperity. However, it is most frequently called just Free Nelson Mandela, because those words are carved in the face of the granite rock that is the bottom portion of the sculpture.

The top portion is a 12 feet high fence of iron bars radiating from the rock and topped with barbed wire. In the fence is a working gate, which was padlocked shut while Mandela was imprisoned. After Mandela's release in 1990, the padlock was unlocked with the key which had been left with Atlanta city officials by the artist. The gate has remained in an open position ever since, and the rock proclaims that there is now a "Free Nelson Mandela". There are also small segments of chain attached to the bottom corners of the rock, adjacent to the base. At some point after the gate was opened, three bars to the right of the gate were painted, respectively, green, black, and yellow, the colors of the South African flag. The entire sculpture weighs 7 tons.

== Creation ==
Hammons created the sculpture while an artist in residence for Atlanta's Arts Festival. Faculty and students at Georgia State University assisted in the construction at GSU's sculpture studio. Atlanta's Office of Cultural Affairs is responsible for the restoration and maintenance of the piece. In addition to the intrinsic value of the sculpture and the historical statement, this piece is significant because it is one of the few, if only, public art works by Hammons.

== Location ==
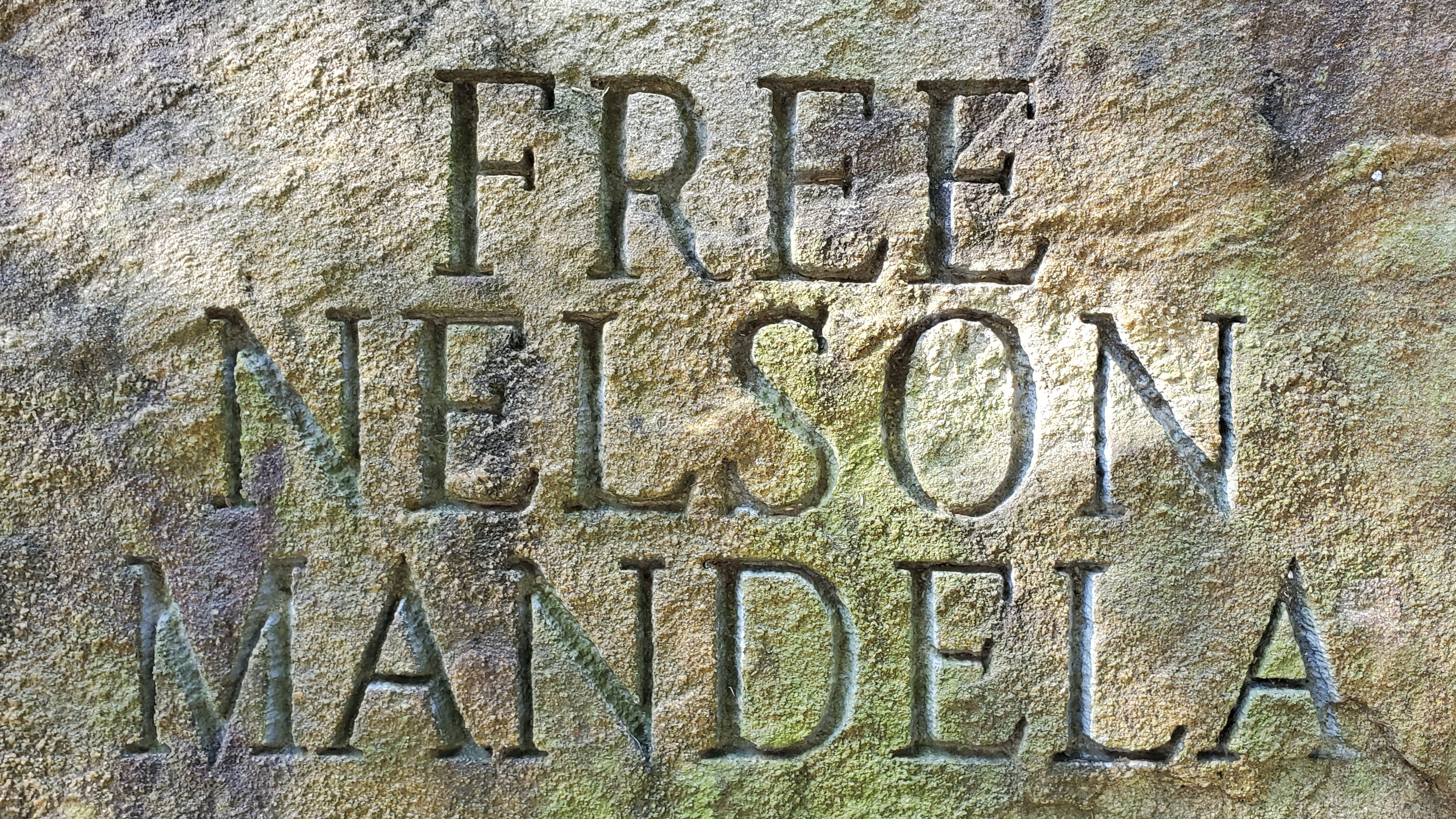
Inscription on the front of the sculpture

The original site was the north end of Atlanta's Woodruff Park, where it was installed in April, 1987 and presented by then Atlanta Mayor, Andrew Young, as part of a dedication ceremony on June 4, 1987. It is currently located in Piedmont Park. Specifically, it is 50 yards inside the Charles Allen Dr. entrance, which is on the southern end of the park bounded by 10th Street, just inside the eastmost end of the Oak Hill walking trail.

== Controversy ==
The sculpture is difficult to find because it is overgrown by shrubs planted as part of a park renovation. The boldness and harshness of the statement is softened considerably by the vegetation, which was not part of the artist's fixture.

In addition, the description on the Smithsonian Institution's Art Inventories Catalog states that the gate is left of center. It is implied that this information was gathered in the "Save Outdoor Sculpture, Georgia, Atlanta survey, 1994." If this is true, then the current setting has viewers looking at the back of the piece and the front is covered with shrubbery.

== Images ==
Photos taken:

- before the Piedmont Park re-landscaping, on the website of the Atlanta Office of Cultural Affairs
- in 2005
- in 2007
- in 2012
