= African-American Flag =

Artwork by David Hammons

Untitled (African American Flag)
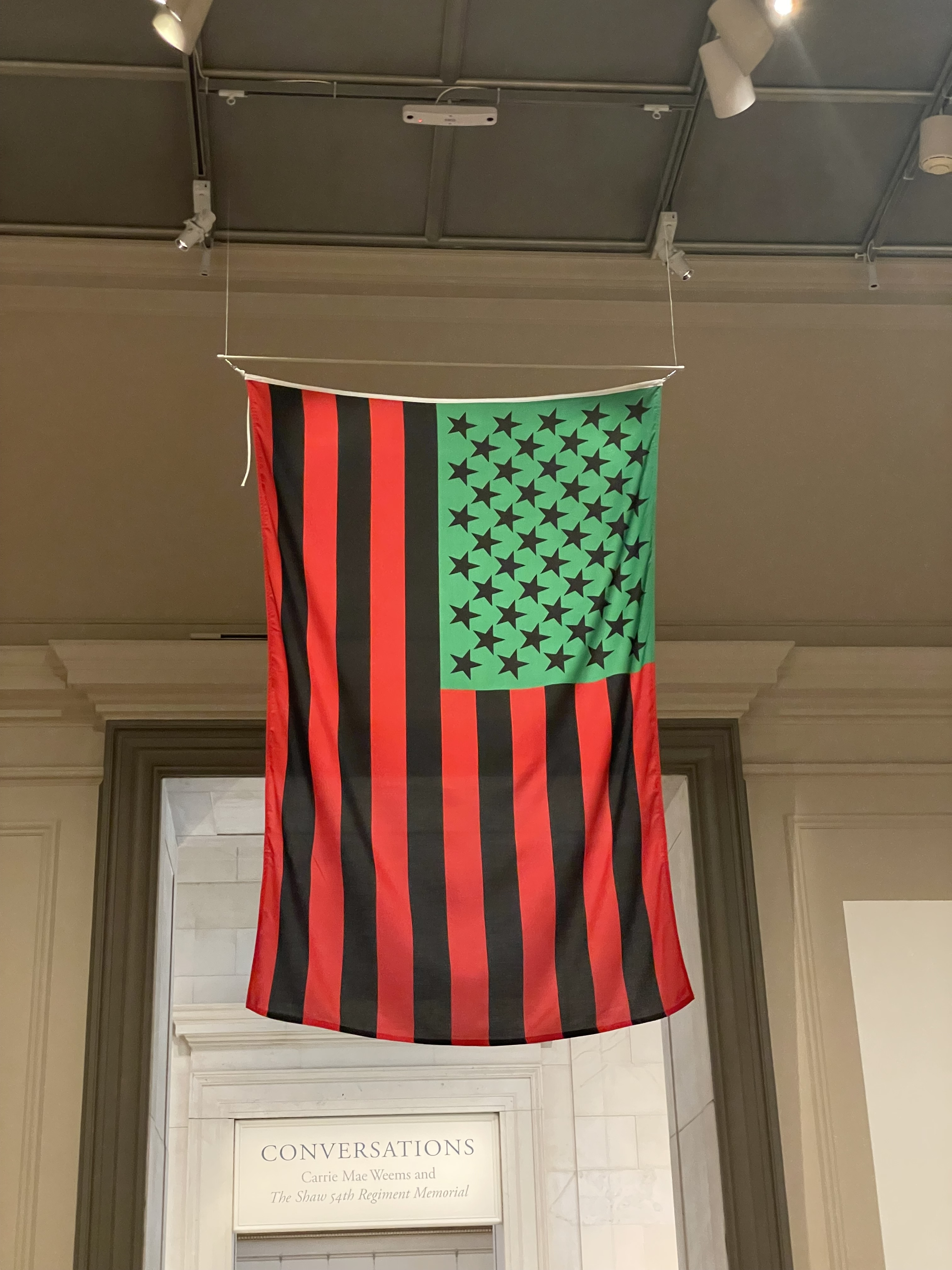
- African American Flag (1990) in 2022 at the National Gallery of Art's showing of Afro-Atlantic Histories
- Artist: David Hammons
- Year: 1990
- Medium: Fabric
- Movement: Contemporary art
- Dimensions: 142.2 cm × 223.5 cm (56.0 in × 88.0 in)
- Location: The Broad, Jack Shainman Gallery, Museum of Modern Art, National Museum of African American History and Culture, The New School, Studio Museum in Harlem

Untitled (African-American Flag) is a vexillographic artwork by American artist David Hammons from 1990, combining the colors of the Pan-African flag with the pattern of the flag of the United States to represent African diaspora identity. The flag replaces the red, white and blue colors on the traditional American flags with pan-African colors.

It was first created for the art exhibition "Black USA" at an Amsterdam museum in 1990, and its first edition was of five flags, which are now in major museum collections.

The work's creation has been seen in the context of the inauguration of David Dinkins as the first African American mayor of New York City, following his 1989 election. The following year Hammons was awarded the MacArthur Genius Fellowship for his "contributions to African American cultural identity".

== Collections and galleries ==
The original series was of five flags, these are sometimes known as the 'Amsterdam flags'. The original series was followed by another series of ten.

The original series flags include the versions in the collections of:

- Museum of Modern Art, New York, (two versions, one shared with the Studio Museum in Harlem)
- The Broad, Los Angeles
- National Museum of African American History and Culture, Smithsonian Institution, Washington, DC
- The Collection Over Holland

The work is also in following collections but it is unclear when they were created:

- Jack Shainman Gallery
- The New School, New York
- Pizzuti collection, Columbus, Ohio

== Display and symbolism ==
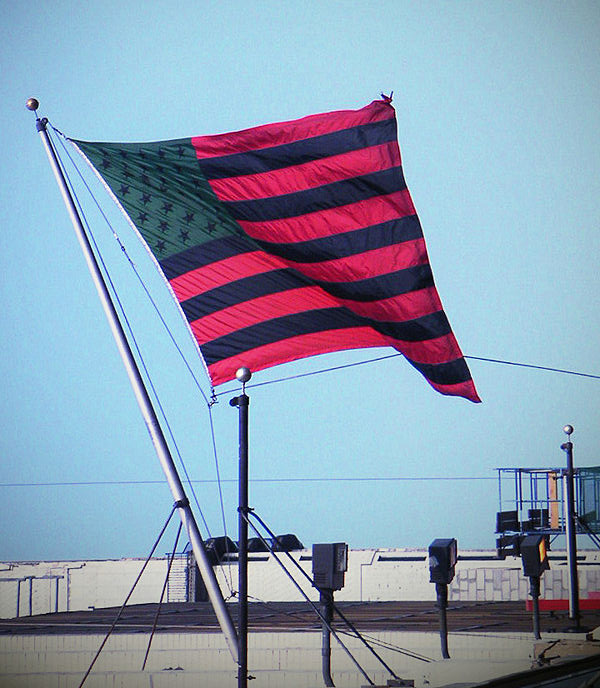
The Hammons flag at the Studio Museum in Harlem, 2007

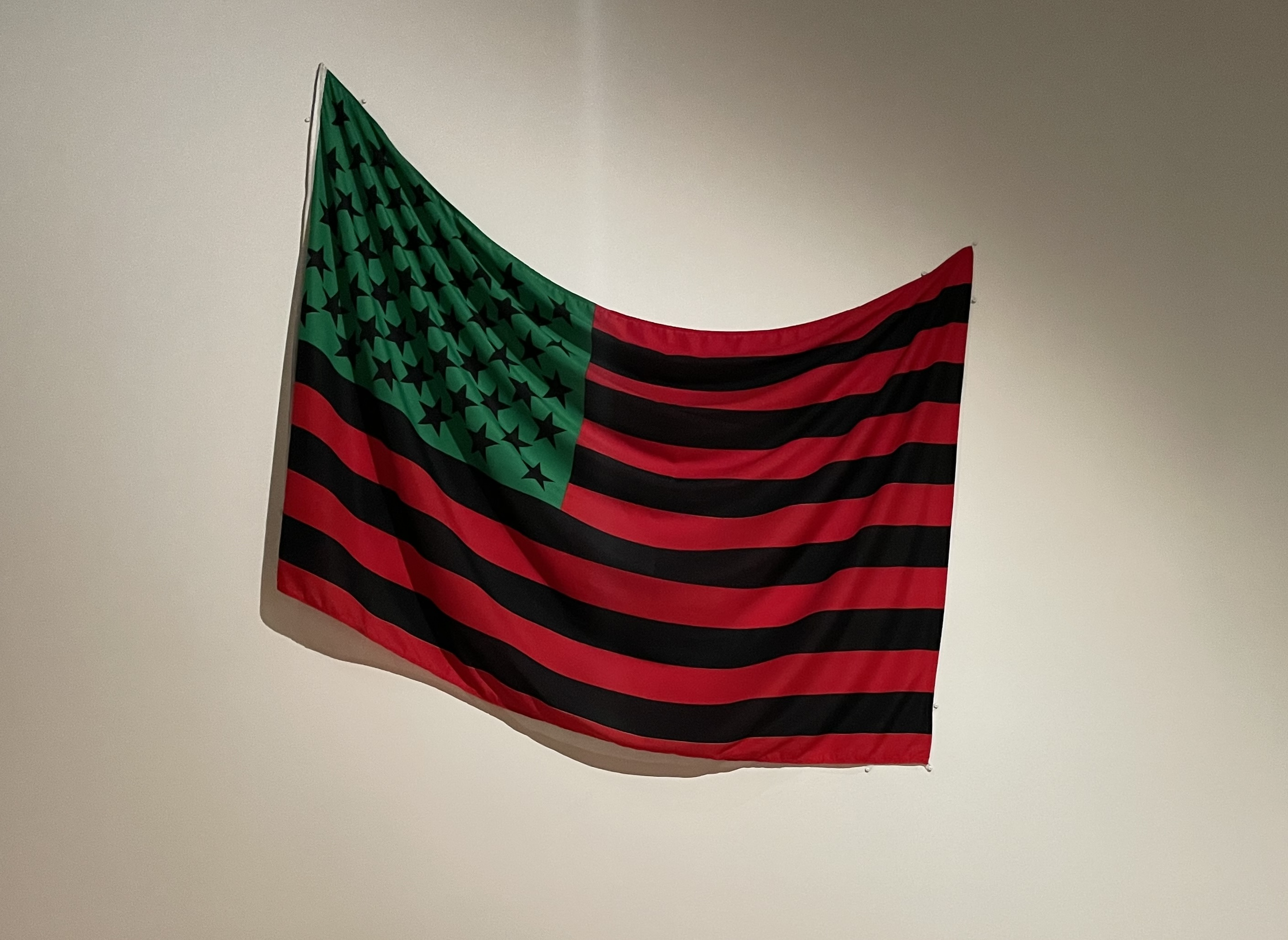
The Hammons flag on display at the National Museum of African American History and Culture, 2023

A vector graphic rendition of the flag

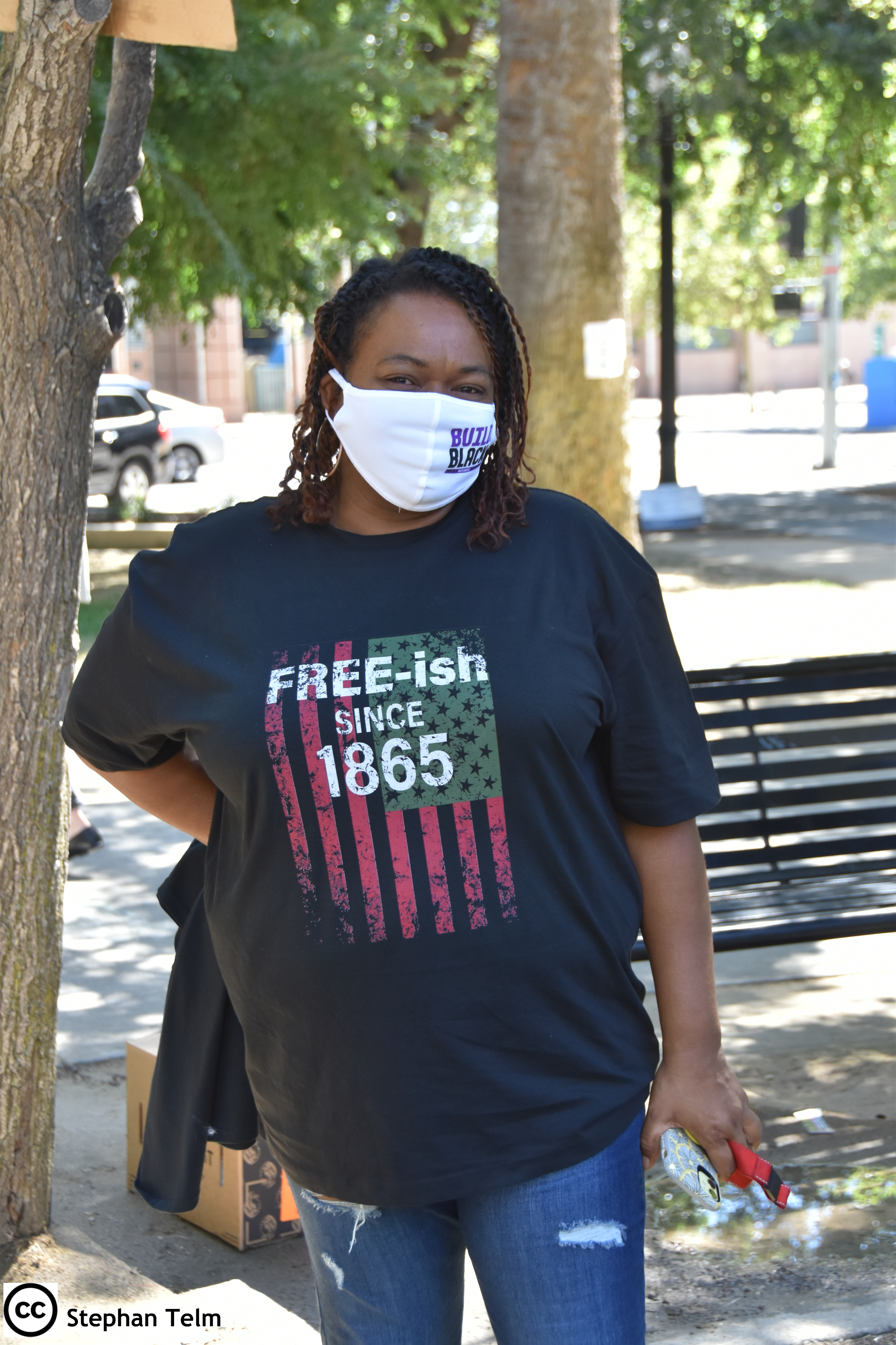
Juneteenth, June 2020, Sacramento, California, US

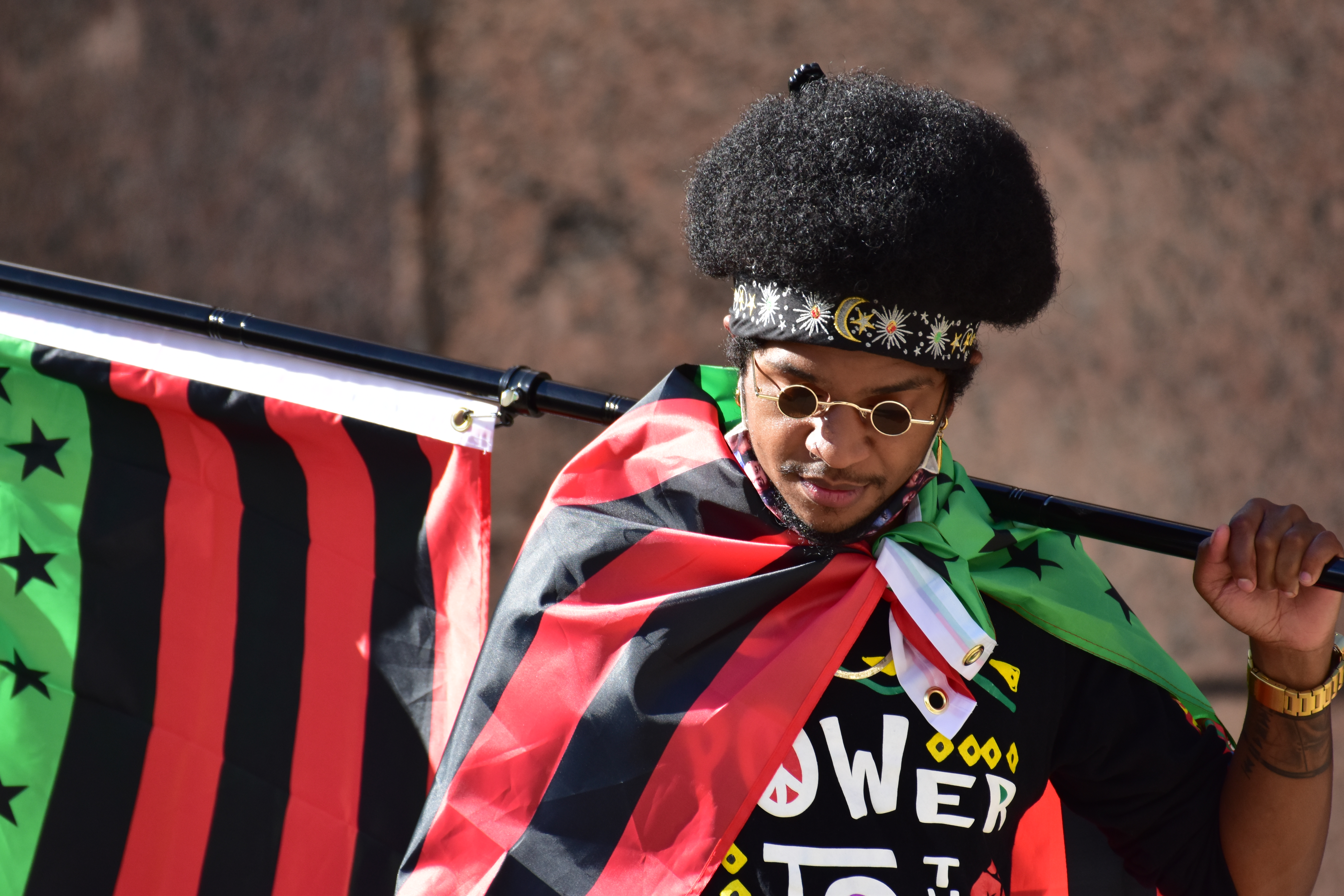
Protect Our Votes rally, November 2020, Raleigh, North Carolina, US

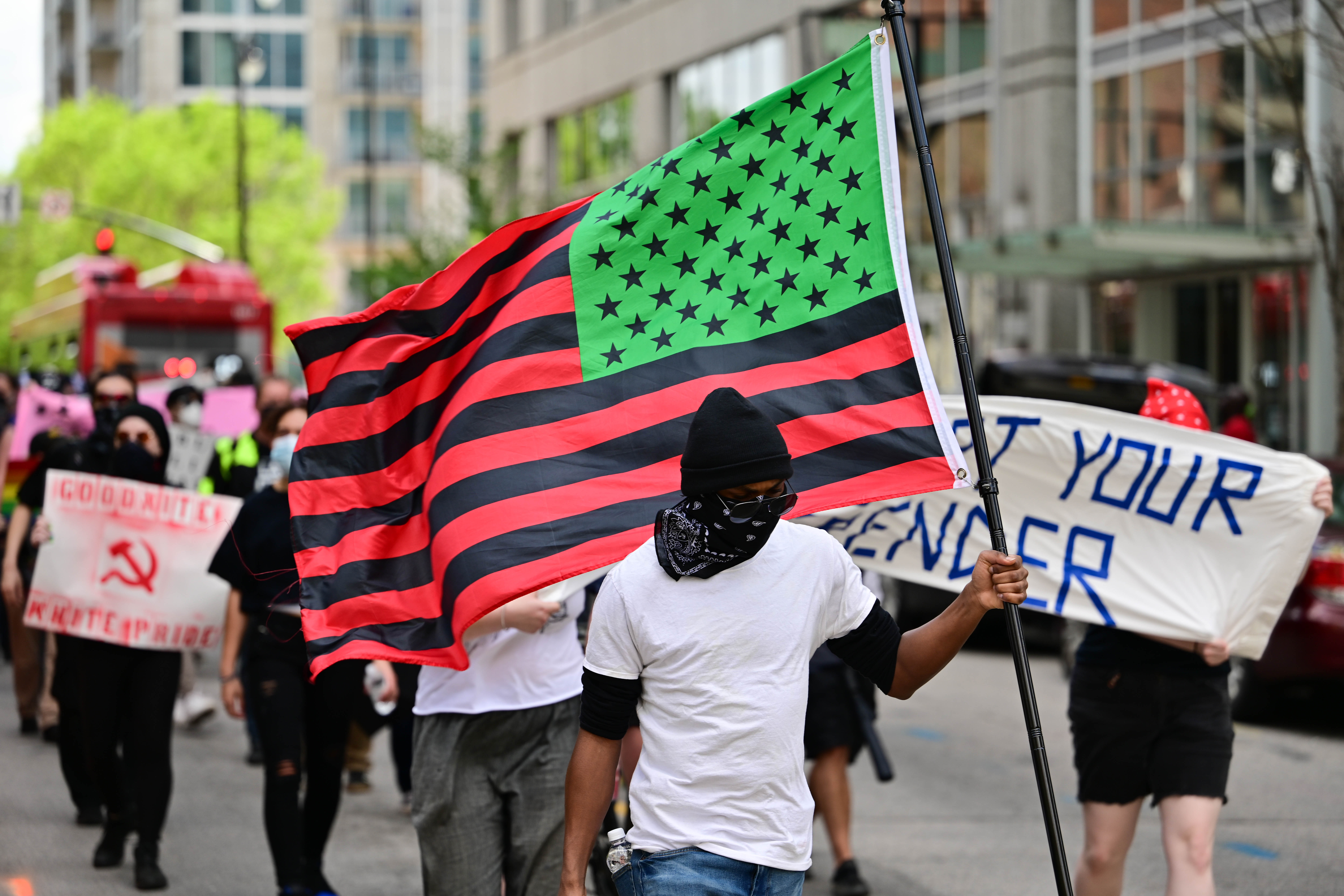
Boot Out White Power protest, April 2021, Raleigh, North Carolina, US

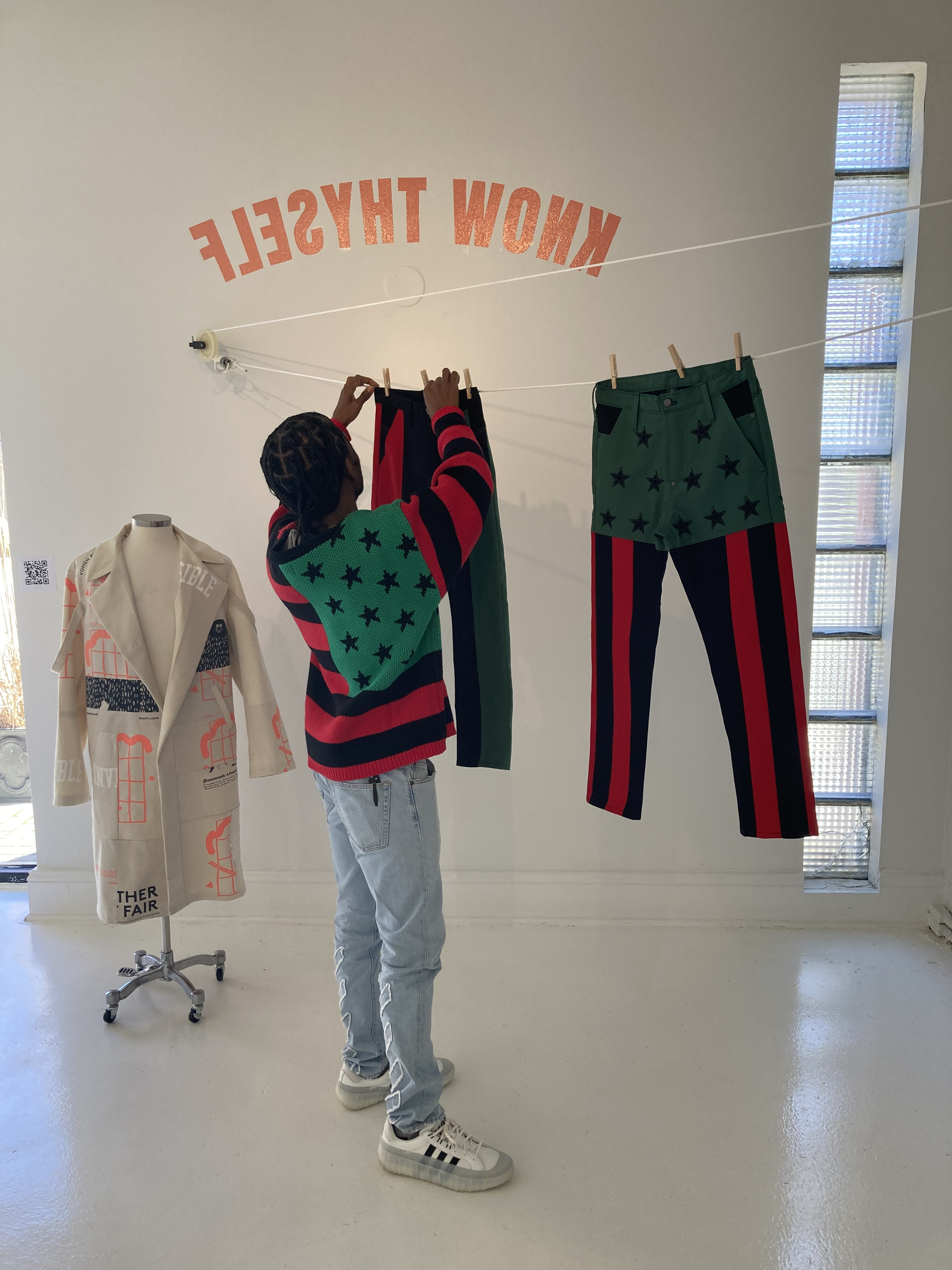
Artist Brandon Breaux and flag artworks at his solo show BIG WORDS at Blanc Art Gallery in Chicago

Since 2004 the Studio Museum Harlem has flown its version of the artwork above its entrance in Harlem, New York.

Replicas of Hammon's flag are frequently flown at social justice protests and demonstrations.

== See also ==
- Ethnic flag
