= Pan-African colours =

Red, gold, green and black

The civil flag of Ethiopia, the colours of which have been adopted by numerous pan-African groups.

Unofficial Pan-African/UNIA flag

Pan-African colours is a term that may refer to two different sets of colours:

- Green, yellow and red, the colours of the flag of Ethiopia, have come to represent the pan-Africanist ideology due to the country's history of having avoided being taken over by a colonial power. Numerous African countries have adopted the colours into their national flags, and they are similarly used as a symbol by many Pan-African organisations and the Rastafari movement.
- Red, black, and green, first introduced by Marcus Garvey in 1920, have also come to represent Pan-Africanism, and are shown on the pan-African flag. These colours have also been incorporated on national flags, and they have sometimes been used to represent black nationalism rather than Pan-Africanism.

== Green-yellow-red ==
Green, yellow, and red are now found on the national flags of many African nations. The colour combination was borrowed from the flag of Ethiopia. The Ethiopian flag has influenced the flags of many Pan-African organizations and polities. Except for relatively brief periods of influence and occupation by the Kingdom of Italy, Ethiopia remained outside European control during the colonial era by defeating the Italian army at the battle of Adwa in 1896, ending the Italian protectorate. As a result, the country drew the admiration of many newly independent states in Africa. The adoption of the Ethiopian national colours by many Pan-African entities is a consequence of this. The first African state to adopt a gold, red and green flag upon independence was Ghana in 1957, designed by Theodosia Okoh.

== Red-black-green ==
The Universal Negro Improvement Association and African Communities League (UNIA) founded by Marcus Garvey has a constitution that defines red, black, and green as the Pan-African colours: "red representing the noble blood that unites all people of African ancestry, the colour black for the people, green for the rich land of Africa." The UNIA flag was designated the official colours of Black Africans by the UNIA at its convention in Madison Square Garden on August 13, 1920, in New York City, United States.

Red is the color of the blood which men must shed for their redemption and liberty; black is the color of the noble and distinguished race to which we belong; green is the color of the luxuriant vegitation of our Motherland.

— George Alexander McGuire, Universal Black Man Catechism, 1921

== Flags with Pan-African colours ==
=== Current country and territory flags with the Pan-African symbolism ===
The following are countries and territories that use one or both sets of Pan-African colours in their official flags:

Benin

Burkina Faso

Cameroon

Central African Republic

Chad

Republic of the Congo

Ghana

Guinea

Guinea-Bissau

Kenya

Malawi

Mali

Mauritania

Senegal

São Tomé and Príncipe

South Sudan

Togo

=== Non-national flags ===
African National Congress

African-American Flag by David Hammons

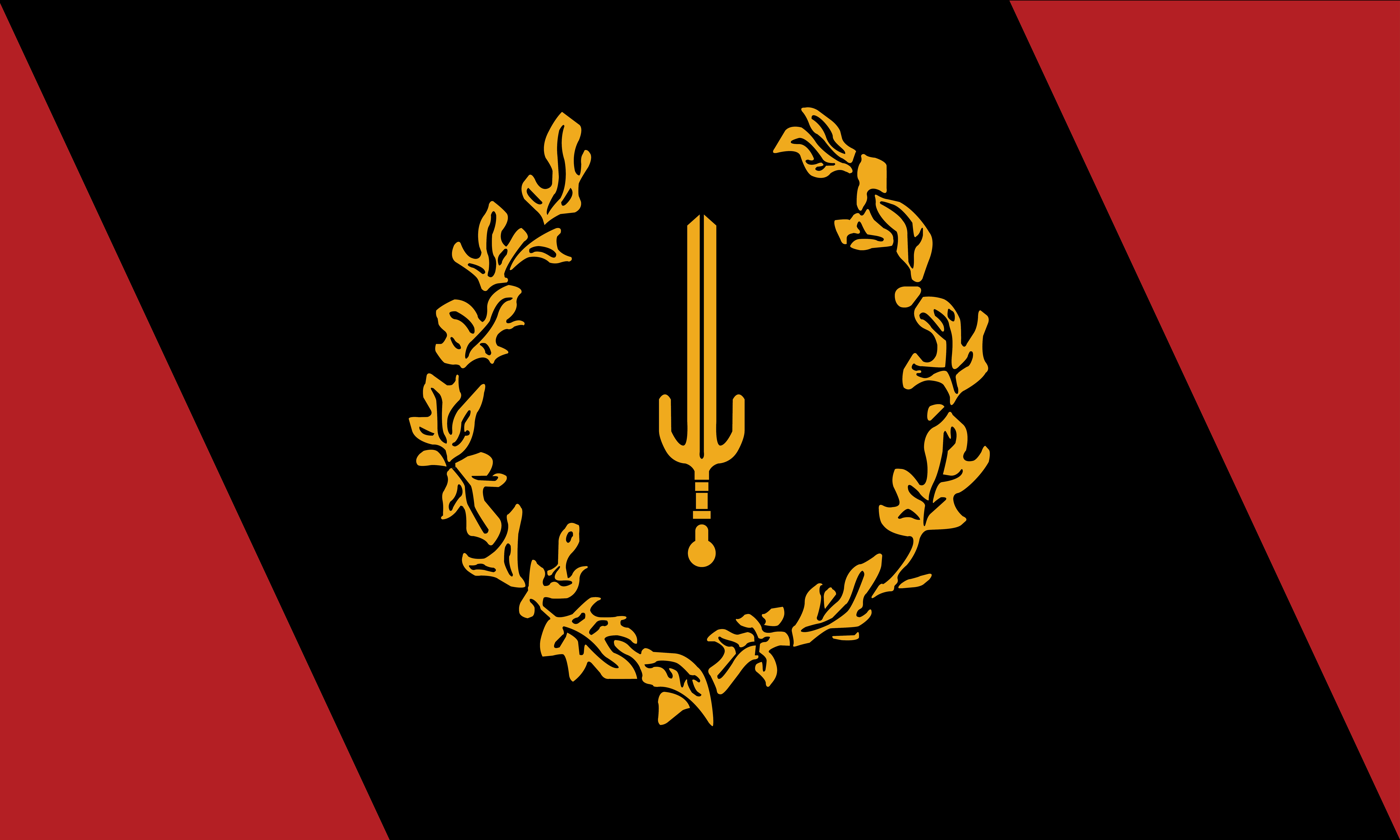
Black American Heritage Flag

Azawad

Sudan Liberation Movement/Army

Union of African States (1958–1961)

Union of African States (1961–1962)

Interahamwe

Republic of New Afrika

=== Former flags with pan-African colours ===
Cape Verde (1975–1992)

Malawi (2010–2012)

Rwanda (1961–2001)

South Kasai (1960–1961)

Zaire (Congo-Kinshasa) (1971–1997)

Flag of Tanganyika (1961–1964)

Flag of Senegal (1958–1959)

== See also ==
- Flag of Lithuania
- Nordic Cross Flag
- Pan-African flag
- Pan-Arab colors
- Pan-Slavic colors
- Tricolour
  - Malay tricolour
- United States of Africa
- Pan-African Flags
