= Alex Harsley =

- Born: 1938 (age 87–88); Rock Hill, South Carolina, U.S.
- Known for: Photography
- Children: Kendra Krueger

Alex Harsley (born 1938 in Rock Hill, South Carolina) is an American photographer, multimedia artist and founder of the Fourth Street Photo Gallery who lives and works in New York City.

== Early life and education ==
Harsley was born to a Methodist mother in Rock Hill and began working on the family cotton and peanut farm as a child during World War II. He met his father, a soldier, in 1945. Harsley moved to New York City in 1948.

== Career ==
Harsley purchased his first real camera, an Exakta XV, in 1959. His first job in New York was a bike messenger, allowing him to multitask as a street photographer. Harsley was the first black photographer in the New York City District Attorney's office under Frank Hogan. In 1959 he had his first photo exhibition in Harlem.

Originally Harsley worked in street photography, events and portraiture. He has photographed John Coltrane and Ray Charles at the Apollo, Sarah Vaughn at Birdland, Muhammad Ali, Jean-Michel Basquiat and Shirley Chisholm’s nomination for President.He photographed activists Harry Belefonte, Coretta Scott King, Paul Robeson Jr and Angela Davis when they met for the first time at a benefit in 1972. A Harsley photo of Muhammad Ali adorned Darren Walker's office in 2019.

Harsley began working in video and digital photography, creating experimental video works and collaborating with artist David Hammons with many of his performance works. Hammons' "Phat Free" video was a collaboration with Harsley and was included in the 1997 Whitney Biennial.

=== 4th Street Photo Gallery ===
Harsley founded Minority Photographers, Inc. in 1971 on the Lower East Side of Manhattan. He created the nonprofit, 4th Street Photo Gallery, in 1973 as a venue for the group and his growing community of photographers. Exhibitions at the gallery included the work of Curtis Cuffie, Dawoud Bey, Eli Reed, Cynthia MacAdams, Denise Keim, David Hammons and Terry Adkins, and the photos of musician Vernon Reid. Harsley gave Andres Serrano his first exhibition in New York City. It was known as "the Black barbershop of photography," where emerging artists of color mingled with notable artists like Abelardo Morell, Spencer Tunick and A. D. Coleman.

== Personal life ==
Harsley is an avid bicyclist. He married Shelagh Krueger and has a daughter named Kendra Krueger who has been helping to archive his work.
