= Day's End (David Hammons) =

Permanent public art project by David Hammons

- Day's End in 2022
- Artist: David Hammons
- Year: 2014–2021
- Dimensions: 50 ft × 373 ft (600 in × 4,480 in)
- Location: Whitney Museum of American Art at Hudson River Park

Day's End is a 2021 permanent public art project designed by the American artist David Hammons. Originally commissioned by the Whitney Museum of American Art, the work consists of an architectural outline of a pier made of stainless steel tubes and precast concrete and installed on the Hudson River Park along the southern edge of Gansevoort Peninsula.

== History ==
The work was inspired by the 1975 intervention installation work titled Days End by the American 20th-century artist Gordon Matta-Clark. In the original installation, Matta-Clark created five large incisions into the Pier 52 shed, which had formerly occupied the site and measured 373 feet in length and 50 feet in height. The purpose of Matta-Clark's work was to "let in light that would change during days and seasons", which he saw as “a peaceful enclosure”. The artist also described it as a "renovation" of a "decaying sad reminder of a previous industrial era".

The contemporary work by Hammons was announced by the Whitney Museum in 2017 and completed in 2021. It is made of stainless steel tubes and precast concrete and consists of an open structure that adheres to the dimensions, proportions, and placement of the previous shed. The director of the Whitney Adam D. Weinberg called the installation a "hybrid" which incorporated "architecture, sculpture, drawing, site-specific project, land art, appropriated object, and none of the above".

== Reception ==
Upon its unveiling in 2021, Critic Holland Cotter of The New York Times called the work "an immortalizing homage to Gordon Matta-Clark and art history" and suggested that it was "roomy enough to accommodate all the brilliant fragments of an incomparable career". At the same time, Kathleen Langjahr, writing for The Architect's Newspaper, said that Day's End failed to "live up to the impossible hopes of a previous generation". She also remained skeptical of the public character of the artwork saying that the installation, similarly to the neighboring Little Island at Pier 55, was "pitched as a 'gift' from the city’s wealthiest, for which we are expected to be grateful". In a review for Artforum, Peter L'Official recalled the rich queer history of Pier 52, once a prominent cruising site for gay men in the 1970s. He drew attention to the compelling connection between this storied location and Alvin Baltrop's evocative photographs, which capture the homosexual encounters of that era.
