= Flag of Togo =

Togolese Republic
- Use: National flag and ensign
- Proportion: 3:5, 1:𝜑 or 2:3
- Adopted: 27 April 1960; 66 years ago
- Design: Five horizontal stripes alternating between green and yellow; in the canton, a five-pointed white star on a red field
- Designed by: Paul Ahyi

The national flag of Togo consists of five horizontal stripes, alternating between green and yellow, with a red square bearing a five-pointed white star in the canton. It is one of many African flags that use the pan-African colours of green, yellow, and red. Togolese artist Paul Ahyi designed the flag in 1960, just before its adoption on 27 April of that year, coinciding with Togo's proclamation of independence. When Togo was an autonomous republic within the French Union (the successor to the French colonial empire), it flew a green flag with the French tricolour in the canton and two five-pointed yellow stars, one in the lower hoist and one in the upper fly.

== Design ==
Togolese artist Paul Ahyi (1930–2010) was the designer of the flag. Ahyi studied art in France and graduated from the École nationale supérieure des beaux-arts in Paris in 1959 before returning to Togo. The following year, he designed the flag of Togo, which was adopted upon the country's proclamation of independence on 27 April 1960.

The design of the flag is outlined in Title I, Article 3 of the Constitution of Togo, 1992 (2019 revision). It states:

L'emblème national est le drapeau composé de cinq bandes horizontales alternées de couleur verte et jaune. Il porte à l'angle supérieur gauche une étoile blanche à cinq branches sur fond carré rouge.
The national emblem [flag] is the flag composed of five alternating horizontal bands of green and yellow. It bears in the upper left corner a white five-pointed star on a red square background.

The proportions of the flag are not mentioned in the constitution and sources differ as to the exact ratio. American vexillologist Whitney Smith, writing in the Encyclopædia Britannica, stated that the width-to-length ratio is approximately 3:5. Polish vexillologist Alfred Znamierowski meanwhile stated that the ratio is 2:3. It has also been claimed that Ahyi followed the golden ratio (represented by the Greek letter phi, 𝜑) when designing the flag, which would make it a golden rectangle. In other words, its width-to-length ratio would be 1:𝜑, where 𝜑 = (1+√5)/2 ≈ 1.618.

=== Symbolism ===
The flag uses the pan-African colours of green, yellow, and red, which were adopted by several other African countries upon independence. Its five stripes represent the five regions of Togo. The office of the Togolese president gives the following significance to the flag's colours and symbols: green represents forests, agriculture, and hope; yellow represents natural resources, faith, and maturity; red represents the blood shed by those who fought for Togolese independence; and the white star represents peace, intelligence, and light.

== Historical flags ==
Flag of French Togoland (1956–1960)

During the colonial era, Togo flew the flag of its colonial ruler: Germany from 1884 to 1914 (as part of German Togoland) and France from 1916 to 1960. The United Nations trusteeship system established after World War II obliged France to move Togo (then French Togoland) towards self-government. Togo was made an autonomous republic within the French Union on 24 August 1956, and a new flag was adopted along with a motto, an anthem, and a national day. The flag was a green field with the French tricolour in the canton and two five-pointed yellow stars, one in the lower hoist and one in the upper fly. The green field represented agriculture, hope, and youth, while the two stars represented Togo's northern savannas and southern coastal plains.

== Coat of arms ==
Coat of arms of Togo

The flag of Togo is featured on the country's coat of arms. Its inclusion is described in the Togolese constitution:

Les armoiries de la République togolaise sont ainsi constituées ... écu d'argent de forme ovale et à la bordure de sinople, en chef l'emblème national, deux drapeaux adossés et devise sur banderole; en coeur de sable les initiales de la République togolaise sur fond d'or échancré; en pointe, deux lions de gueules adossés.
The coat of arms of the Togolese Republic is thus constituted ... [a] silver shield of oval shape and with a sinople border, in the chief the national emblem, two flags back-to-back and the motto on a banner; in the heart of sable, the initials of the Togolese Republic on a background of indented gold; at the base, two lions gules back-to-back.

== See also ==
- List of Togolese flags
