= Togo National Museum =

Museum in Togo

- Musée National du Togo
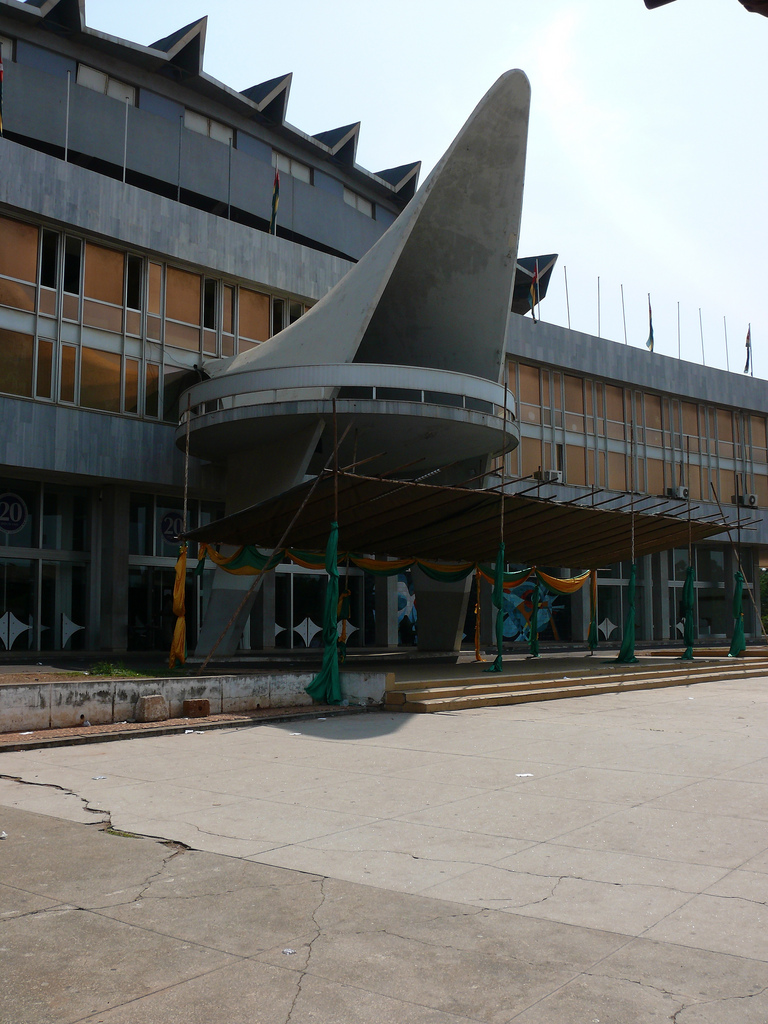
- Established: 1975
- Location: Lomé, Maritime, Togo
- Coordinates: 6.1304°N 1.2174°E
- Type: Museum

Togo National Museum (French: Musée national du Togo) is the national museum of Togo, located in the capital of Lomé. Founded in 1975, it features cultural and historical exhibits. The museum showcases artifacts dating back thousands of years, including musical instruments such as the xalam, baskets decorated with shells and calabashes used to preserve food and water, clay pots, wood carvings, clothes, metalwork, and tobacco pipes.
