= David Hammons =

American artist

- Born: July 24, 1943 (age 83); Springfield, Illinois, U.S.
- Notable work: Bliz-aard Ball Sale (1983); Free Nelson Mandela (1987); How Ya Like Me Now? (1988); Untitled (African-American Flag) (1990); Day's End (2021)
- Movement: Postmodernism, conceptual art

David Hammons (born July 24, 1943) is an American artist, best known for his works in and around New York City and Los Angeles during the 1970s and 1980s.

== Early life ==
David Hammons was born in 1943 in Springfield, Illinois, the youngest of ten children being raised by a single mother. This dynamic caused great financial strain on his family during his childhood; he later stated that he is uncertain how they managed to 'get by' during this time. Although not inclined academically, Hammons showed an early talent for drawing and art; however the ease at which these practices came to him caused him to develop disdain for it. In 1962 he moved to Los Angeles, where he started attending Chouinard Art Institute (now CalArts) from 1966 to 1968 and the Otis Art Institute from 1968 to 1972. He was never officially enrolled there, but Charles White allowed him to attend night classes. There he was influenced by artists such as Charles White, Bruce Nauman, John Baldessari, Noah Purifoy, and Chris Burden, all of whom would soon be internationally known. During his time in LA, he met Senga Nengudi, a performance and conceptual artist with whom he later shared a studio. With Nengudi and others, Hammons formed Studio Z (artist collective) (a.k.a. LA Rebellion), an art collective that collaborated on artistic works. Other members of Studio Z included Maren Hassinger, Ronn Davis, Duval Lewis, RoHo, Franklin Parker, Barbara McCullough, Houston Conwill, and Joe Ray (artist). In 1974 Hammons settled in New York City, where he slowly became better known nationally. He still lives and works in New York.

== Personal life ==
In 1966, Hammons married Rebecca Williams, with whom he had two children. The couple divorced in 1972.

In 2003, Hammons married Chie Hasegawa, a Japanese-born artist.

Hammons has been reluctant to discuss his early and personal life, as he wishes to avoid his work being framed in a certain way. This is exhibited in how he inverts the stereotypical relationship between creator and curator, stating "The way I see it, the Whitney Biennial and Documenta need me, but I don't need them".

Hammons has been philanthropic with other black artists, namely by buying their work and helping them gain recognition.

== Art practice ==
Through his varied work and media, and frequent changes in direction, Hammons has managed to avoid one signature visual style. Much of his work makes allusions to, and shares concerns with minimalism and post-minimal art, but with added Duchampian references to the place of Black people in American society. Hammons' work is made of not only allusions, but also metaphors. These metaphors develop into symbols that hold significant meaning in the art world as well as in the public eye. David Hammons continues to offers a crucial interpretation of the African-American art history in the life of a colored person through these symbols. It has been stated by Anthony Huberman that "Hammons work plays with art the way a jazz musician plays with sound - he gets inside it, bends it, twists it around and keeps it from getting too still or getting too comfortable."

David Hammons was considered quite distinguished from his fellow young African American artists of his time; he was seen as "postblack - avant la lettre, his work alluded to altruism the rest of us are just waking up to".

On James Turrell's works concerning perception of light, Hammons said "I wish I could make art like that, but we're too oppressed for me to be dabbling out there.... I would love to do that because that could also be very black. You know, as a black artist, dealing just with light. They would say, "how in the hell could he deal with that, coming from where he did?" I want to get to that, I'm trying to get to that, but I'm not free enough yet. I still feel I have to get my message out."

=== Body prints ===
At the start of his career during the 1960s Hammons primary medium was body prints. This unique art was made by greasing Hammons' own body; then, he would press it on the paper and add graphite or another medium to accentuate the body print. Hammons acknowledges that he borrowed this technique from the French Artist, Yves Klein. Much of Hammons' Body Prints reflect one of his main influences for his artwork - that being race. Much of his work reflects his commitment to the civil rights and Black Power movements. As a black man experiencing these movements first-hand his artwork is rooted deeply in his personal experiences. These themes have been demonstrated in a range of his body prints. This is specifically seen in his "Spade" works he created during the 1970s - the word being used ironically to reflect Hammons lack of understanding as to why it is used as a derogatory term for African-Americans. Although not exclusively limited to Body Prints, many of the artworks in this series are conducted in this medium. There is Spade, a 1974 print where the artist pressed his face against the shape leaving a caricature-like imprint of Negroid features. Also in the Spade series is Spade (Power for the Spade) this piece depicts a body print embossed onto a canvas depicting a Spade card you would find in a pack of cards. This artwork attempts to reclaim the term transforming its meaning from a racist term into a "badge of honor". Similarly, his 1970 painting, Black First, America Second, is 2 images of himself being wrapped into the American flag. It is his black self and his American self. He feels as if these two identities that he has are split and fundamentally at odds. They are constantly fighting each other and cannot be joined. Similarly, there is his 'Injustice Case' where he depicts himself bound to a chair and gagged. This image references the treatment of Bobby Seale during the Trial of the Chicago 7 and Hammons' attempts to comment on the inequity suffered by African-Americans at the time. This piece in particular reflects Hammons ability to capture the personal experience of being a Black man in America, especially at the time of the Civil Rights Movement, and has been described by Michael Govan as "an icon for American Art." This piece also reflects Hammons natural artistic talent as it was acquired by the Los Angeles County Museum of Art merely a year after it was made.

=== Sculpture ===
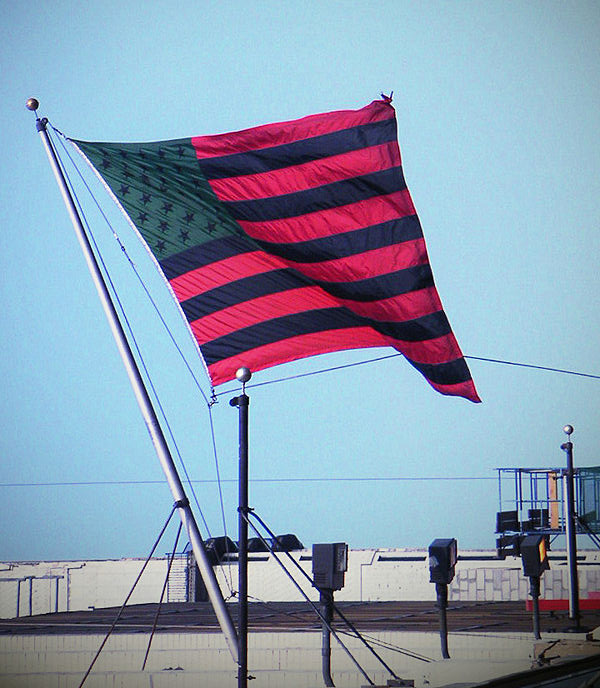
Untitled (African-American Flag) (1990) at The Studio Museum in Harlem in New York.

Untitled (Night Train) (1989) at the Museum of Modern Art in 2022

Later in his career, Hammons has explored the sculptural medium in creating pieces. In his 1970's Spade series included works such as Bird (1973) where the jazz musician Charlie Parker is evoked by a spade emerging from the mouthpiece of a saxophone. The name of the piece reflecting Parker's nickname of "Yardbird" or "Bird". Similarly, there is Spade with Chains (1973), where the artist employs the provocative, derogatory term, coupled with the literal gardening instrument, in order to make a visual pun between the blade of a shovel and an African mask, and a contemporary statement about the issues of bondage and resistance. In his seminal piece, African-American Flag (1990) Hammons tackles the topic head-on. The piece depicts the American Flag in the Garvey Colours of Black, Red and Green (Pan-African Colours), these colours also being used in the UNIA Flag. The importance of this piece is demonstrated in its status as part of the permanent collection of the Museum of Modern Art in New York. A copy of the flag is hoisted at the entrance of the Studio Museum in Harlem. Hammons also created a pan-African flag in his work Oh say can you see (2017). The title of this work refers to lyrics of "The Star-Spangled Banner". Whilst African-American Flag "is a nod to the centrality of the Black experience in America, then Oh Say Can You See – faded, tattered and riddled with holes – is emblematic of the backlash against that belief." Frieze named this later work No.8 of "The 25 Best Works of the 21st Century".

These racial themes have been explored in other sculptural pieces. Hammons use of discarded or abject materials, including but not limited to elephant dung, chicken parts, strands of African-American hair, and bottles of cheap wine provide a crucial interpretation of American life, and art history, from the perspective of a Black person. Many critics see these objects as evocative of the desperation of the poor, Black urban class, but Hammons reportedly saw a sort of sacrosanct or ritualistic power in these materials, which is why he utilized them so extensively. For example, using hair gathered from barbershops and pasting it on top of large stones. These discarded objects have become some of David's Hammons most well known sculptures that represent the life of an African-America living in the United States. His Untitled piece, made over construction rebar coated with dreadlocked hair, was sold to the Whitney Museum for a hundred thousand dollars in 1992. Hammons piece In the Hood has evolved to be a symbol of what it is like to be young, black, and a male. The sculpture was done in 1993 and showed in the Mnuchin Gallery in New York. This simple sculpture is a cut piece of cloth nailed to the wall with a wire threaded through the lining to open the hood up evoking the idea of lynching and becomes a microcosm for what it is like being black in America. It may be simple, but it is so effective and aligns with how much of Hammons' work is done. 'In the Hood' was recast in the cultural-limelight when images of the piece were used as profile pictures on social media for Black Lives Matter supporters following the killing of Trayvon Martin.

However, Hammons artwork is not limited to dealing with the theme of race. He also tackles hierarchical class structure by reflecting it in the dynamic between young black men and basketball. Hammons created a series of larger-than-life basketball hoops, meticulously decorated with bottle caps, evoking Islamic mosaic and design. An example of these 'altars' is High Falutin' or Basketball Chandelier, the latter placing a basketball hoop at its standard height, but rendered unusable by his use of materials - cut glass beads and ornamental sconces.. However, where this theme is most prominently demonstrated is in his 1986 piece Higher Goals. Hammons places an ordinary basketball hoop, net, and backboard on a three-story high pole - commenting on the almost impossible aspirations of sports stardom as a way out of the ghetto. Hammons is noted to say, "It takes five to play on a team, but there are thousands who want to play—not everyone will make it, but even if they don't at least they tried." Higher Goals was on view at the Cadman Plaza Park in New York from 1986 to 1987. He continues his 'Bird' pieces with his 1990 work of the same name. This time he addresses how African-American's have been given wide opportunities in certain industries, such as music and sport, however limited opportunities in others, for example, the Arts. This piece places a basketball, which is adorned with feathers and chicken wire, in the frame of a white-painted Victorian birdcage. The cage symbolizing the metaphorical cage that the African-American community still finds themselves in.

In 2007 Hammons collaborated with his wife, Chie Hasegawa, on a piece that enjoyed public acclaim. In the posh uptown gallery specially selected by Hammons (who does not accept to be associated with any one gallery), they installed full-length fur coats on antique dress forms—two minks, a fox, a sable, a wolf and a chinchilla. They then burned, stained and painted the backs of the coats. This turned the coats into a 'sartorial trap' conjuring thoughts of politics, consumerism, animism, animal rights and more. The irony of this Untitled Exhibition was not merely limited to the coats themselves, but also the location of the exhibition. Presenting it at L & M Arts in uptown Manhattan was a specific decision by Hammons, as he wish to invoke the irony of the coats fitting the representation of Upper East Manhattan lifestyle, yet their awkward fit in other places in New York. Similarly, his 1990–95 work Smoke Screen is made of a swath of golden fabric, giving the piece, at first glance, an upper-class or regal look. However, on closer inspection the fabric is covered in burn holes and cigarette butts adorn the piece and the floor surrounding it.

In 2021, Hammons collaborated with the Hudson River Park Trust and the Whitney Museum to create Days End. This piece is a "ghost monument" to the late artist, Gordon Matta-Clark. Specifically, the art serve as a tribute to Matta-Clark's 'Pier 52' by creating a structural frame of the warehouse that made up the artist work. Matta-Clark had cut five openings in the walls, ceilings,0 and roof of an abandoned pier shed. This will be Hammons only permanent public piece to date. The piece itself is made of steel rods, with half being on land and the others being on steel piles in the Hudson River.

In May 2021 the Whitney Museum of American Art unveiled Hammons completed sculpture Day's End in Hudson River Park across from the Museum itself. The ghostly architectural exoskeletal outline of a pier was inspired by and created in tribute to Day's End, Cinical Inversion an earlier piece by Gordon Matta-Clark (1943-1978) where the earlier artist made five incisions into the Pier 52 building which stood on the same site previously.

=== Performance ===
Hammons has expanded his repertoire into the performance medium. This medium allowed Hammons to discuss notions of public and private spaces, as well as what constitutes a valuable commodity. This was most notably seen in his 1983 piece Bliz-aard Ball Sale. Hammons situates himself alongside street vendors in downtown Manhattan in order to sell snowballs which are priced according to size. This act serves both as a parody on commodity exchange and a commentary on the capitalistic nature of art fostered by art galleries. Furthermore, it puts a satirical premium on "whiteness", ridiculing the superficial luxury of racial classification as well as critiquing the hard social realities of street vending experienced by those who have been discriminated against in terms of race or class. This performance was captured by the Black photographer and friend, Dawoud Bey.

Hammons worked with Bey again in Pissed Off, where he urinated on Richard Serra's giant steel sculpture T.W.U; before tossing a number of pairs of sneakers over the top of the work in Shoe Tree. This gave vibes of shoes draped over phone lines in inner-city neighborhoods and imposed a black influence on a work done by a white artist.

In a show at the Gallery Shimada, in Yamaguchi, Japan, Hammons placed a large boulder in the back of a truck and then proceeded to drive around the city.

His fur-coat artwork has a performance element to it. Hammons asked Dominique Levy, the co-owner of the L & M Gallery where the coats were to be exhibited, to walk down Madison Avenue wearing one of the coats as Hammons filmed.

In 2020, Hammons shared a previously unpublished image of a performance in an article by Daniel S. Palmer for the New York Times. During a blizzard in 2007, and in others since, Hammons wrapped a winter scarf around the head of a bronze sculpture of a Black woman at the base of the Henry Ward Beecher Monument in Columbus Park, Brooklyn.

=== Other media and exhibitions ===
His first New York show took place in 1975 at Just Above Midtown (JAM), where his artworks were present alongside other artists of colour, including his friend and mentor Charles White. He titled this show Greasy Bags and Barbeque Bones.

In 1980, Hammons took part in Colab's ground-breaking The Times Square Show, which acted as a forum for exchange of ideas for a younger set of alternative artists in New York. His installation was made of glistening scattered shards of glass (from broken bottles of Night Train wine).

Hammons has revisited the association of basketball and young black men in a series of drawings mad by repeatedly bouncing a dirty basketball on huge sheers of clean white paper set on the floor. Traveling was almost 10-feet tall and the name reference both the basketball term of 'Traveling' and being transported.

He has also exhibited the theme of race in other mediums. How Ya Like Me Now depicted the political candidate Jesse Jackson as a white male, with blonde hair and blue eyes as to reflect the racial bias of American Politics. This work, which was painted on a wall, was vandalized by two men with sledgehammers. Hammons continues to display the damaged work, and even includes sledgehammers to add to the character of the piece.

In 1991, Hammons created a site-specific installation for Spoleto Festival USA in Charleston, South Carolina. Hammons erected a structure reminiscent of a Charleston single house with the "intentionally awkward dimensions" of 6 by 20 feet. The work is titled House of the Future and is located on America Street in the depressed, predominantly African-American East Side neighborhood in Charleston. Across the street from the House of the Future, Hammons raised one of his African-American Flags and "replaced a sidewalk-level billboard’s cigarette ad with a photograph of Black children, their gazes upturned."

Untitled (2010) at the Museum of Modern Art in 2022

At a 2011 show at L & M Arts, he presented a number of drawings and painting obscured or cover by tarpaulins or plastic sheets - in one case being covered by a wooden armoire. He has made drawings of Kool-Aid powder before covering them with a curtain; the curtain only being lifted under certain conditions. These pieces reflect the idea that in an age of surveillance and information overflow, Hammons attempts to stem this flow and withhold information. This idea was also seen more literally in his Concerto in Black and Blue where the Ace Gallery in New York was cast in pitch darkness and visitors had to guide themselves with little flashlights.

Hammons explored the video medium, collaborating with artist Alex Harsley on a number of video works, including Phat Free (originally titled Kick the Bucket), which was included in the Whitney Biennial and other venues. Hammons and Harsley have also collaborated on installations at New York's 4th Street Photo Gallery, a noted East Village artist exhibition and project space.

In "The Window: Rented Earth: David Hammons", an early solo exhibition at the New Museum, Hammons dealt with the diametrically opposed relationship between spirituality and technology by juxtaposing an African tribal mask with a modern-day invention—a child's toy television set.

In 2016, Hammons performed a gallery show in collaboration with the Mnuchin Gallery called "David Hammons: Five Decades". As seen in his L & M Arts Exhibition, this choice of location and the disconnect it serves between it and his art is sought by Hammons.

In 2014 Hammons purchased a former warehouse in Yonkers, New York with the intention of creating his own art gallery there.

In 2019 Hauser & Wirth mounted a large retrospective of his work in Los Angeles which included a homeless encampment onsite.

Hammons's work was included in the 2025 exhibition Photography and the Black Arts Movement, 1955–1985 at the National Gallery of Art.

== Influences ==
One of Hammons greatest influences has been the world of music. In the aforementioned Bird he pays homage to the Jazz musician Charlie Parker. Similarly, when Hammons heard that Miles Davis had died he brought a boombox to New York's Museum of Modern Art when he was installing his works for his 1991 show 'Dislocations'. Also, the title of one of his works How Ya Like Me Now comes from a Kool Moe Dee song. In his Mnuchin Exhibition, he placed three microphone stands, with their mouthpieces extending so high that most people could not reach them, with the title Which Mike do you want to be like...? (Referencing Mike Tyson, Michael Jordan and Michael Jackson). He dedicated an exhibition at the Hauser & Wirth Gallery in Los Angeles to Ornette Coleman, describing him as "the Duchamp of music, the one who changed everything".

Another one of Hammons key influences is the French artist Marcel Duchamp. Hammons has described himself as the head of the 'Duchamp Outpatient Clinic' and the company that owns his Yonkers Gallery is called 'Duchamp Realty'.

== Awards ==
Hammons received the MacArthur Fellowship (popularly known as the "Genius Grant") in July 1991.

== Notable works in public collections ==
- Injustice Case (1970), Los Angeles County Museum of Art
- Three Spades (1971), Glenstone, Potomac, Maryland
- Body Print (1974), Harvard Art Museums, Cambridge, Massachusetts
- Body Print (1974-1975), Museum of Contemporary Art, Los Angeles
- Body Print (1975), Museum of Modern Art, New York
- Flight Fantasy (1978), Walker Art Center, Minneapolis
- Untitled (dung) (1983-1985), San Francisco Museum of Modern Art
- Free Nelson Mandela (1987), Piedmont Park, City of Atlanta Mayor's Office of Cultural Affairs
- How Ya Like Me Now? (1988), Glenstone, Potomac, Maryland
- Untitled (Night Train) (1988), Museum of Modern Art, New York
- Untitled (1989), Hirshhorn Museum and Sculpture Garden, Smithsonian Institution, Washington, D.C.
- Untitled (African-American Flag) (1990), The Broad, Los Angeles; Museum of Modern Art, New York (2 editions, 1 shared with Studio Museum in Harlem); National Museum of African American History and Culture, Smithsonian Institution, Washington, D.C.; and The New School, New York
- Esquire (or John Henry) (1990), Rubell Museum, Miami/Washington, D.C.
- Putting on Sunday Manners (1990), San Francisco Museum of Modern Art
- Chasing the Blue Train (1989-1991), Stedelijk Museum voor Actuele Kunst, Ghent, Belgium
- Money Tree (1992), Museum of Modern Art, New York; Nasher Museum of Art, Durham, North Carolina; and Seattle Art Museum
- Untitled (1992), Whitney Museum, New York
- Freudian Slip (1995), Glenstone, Potomac, Maryland
- Too Obvious (1996), Studio Museum in Harlem, New York
- Praying to Safety (1997), Museum of Contemporary Art, Chicago
- Stone with Hair (1998), Fondation Cartier pour l'Art Contemporain, Paris
- Phat Free (1995-1999), Art Institute of Chicago; Harvard Art Museums, Cambridge, Massachusetts; Metropolitan Museum of Art, New York; Stedelijk Museum voor Actuele Kunst, Ghent, Belgium; Tate, London; Walker Art Center, Minneapolis; and Whitney Museum, New York
- High Level of Cat (1999), Seattle Art Museum
- Basketball Drawing (2001), Buffalo AKG Art Museum, Buffalo, New York
- Traveling (2001-2002), Baltimore Museum of Art
- The Holy Bible: Old Testament (2002), Museion, Bolzano, Italy; Museum of Modern Art, New York; Nasher Museum of Art, Durham, North Carolina; National Gallery of Canada Library, Ottawa; Rubell Museum, Miami/Washington, D.C.; The Frances Young Tang Teaching Museum and Art Gallery, Saratoga Springs, New York; and Walker Art Center, Minneapolis
- Oh say can you see (2017), Pinault Collection, Paris
- Day's End (2014-2021), Gansevoort Peninsula (former Pier 52), Meatpacking District, New York (maintained by Whitney Museum)
