= Emblem of Togo =

National coat of arms

Emblem of the Togolese Republic
- Armiger: Togolese Republic
- Adopted: 14 March 1962 (standardized June 2008)
- Motto: "Travail, Liberté, Patrie" ("Work, Liberty, Fatherland")

The emblem of Togo was adopted on 14 March 1962.

In the device, two standing red lions are to be seen, which symbolize the bravery of the people. Both lions are armed with bow and arrow, symbolizing a call for all citizens to be active in the defence of freedom of the country. Between the lions, a golden shield with the letters RT (République Togolaise) is displayed. Above it, the flag of Togo is displayed twice. On a ribbon stands Togo's motto: "Travail, Liberté, Patrie" (Work, Liberty, Homeland).

After Togo's 1991 National Conference, multiple versions of this emblem proliferated, even within the Togolese government. In June 2008, however, a Constitutional Court decision clarified which version was correct.

== Official description ==
The emblem of the Republic of Togo consists of the following:

- an oval escutcheon argent and a bordure vert, in chief the national emblem, two flags addorsed and the motto on a riband; in fess point, in sable, the initials of the Republic of Togo on background engrailed or; in base two lions addorsed gules;
- the two young lions are a symbol of courage of the Togolese people. They hold the bow and the arrow, traditional means of combat, to show that the true freedom of the Togolese people is in their own hands and their strength lies in their own traditions; the lions, upright and addorsed, express the vigilance of the Togolese people on the guard of their independence, from dawn until dusk.

== Earlier coats of arms ==
=== Proposed arms 1914 ===
Proposed German arms 1914

In 1914, the German government decided to assign coats of arms to its overseas colonies, including Togoland. Arms were designed, but World War I broke out before the project was finalised, and the arms were never actually taken into use. Giving the colonies their own insignia in time of war could let them have a symbol to rally around in case of rebellion. The arms proposed for the Protectorate of Togoland depicted a tree supported by two cobra snakes and the German imperial eagle on a chief. The eagle and the imperial crown on the shield was the same for all the proposed colonial arms.

=== Seal of French Togoland ===
Seal of the French Togoland (1916-1960), adopted in 1932.
