= Flag of the Cherokee Nation =

Cherokee Nation of Oklahoma
- Adopted: October 9, 1978, September 9, 1989 (modified)
- Designed by: Stanley John

The flag of the Cherokee Nation was adopted by the Cherokee Nation of Oklahoma on October 9, 1978.

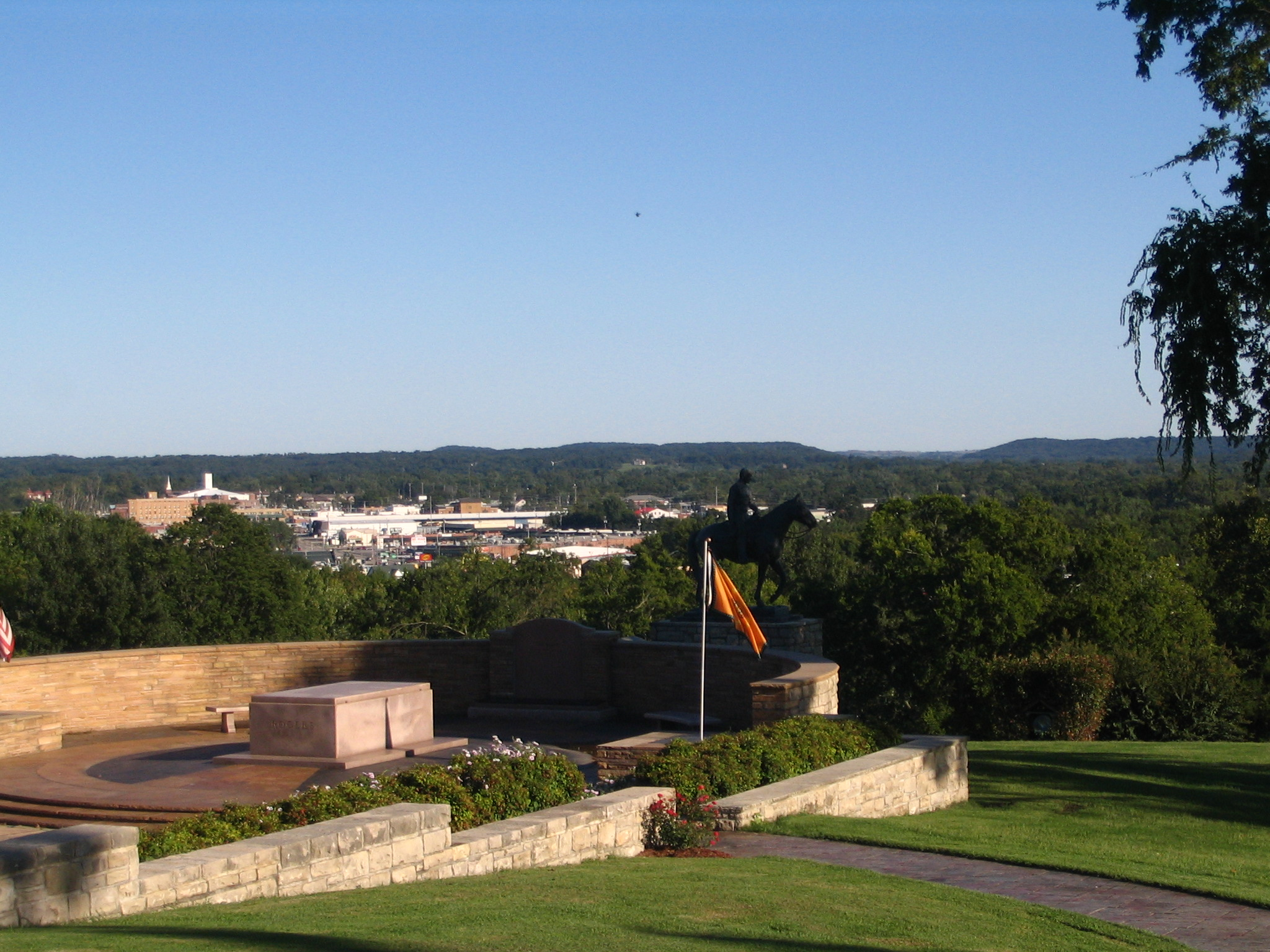
The modern Cherokee Nation flag displayed at the tomb of Will Rogers in Claremore

== Background ==
The Cherokee Nation is the largest of the three federally-recognized tribes of Cherokee in the United States. First recognized under the Franklin Roosevelt administration in 1941, it drafted a constitution under the name "Cherokee Nation of Oklahoma." The constitution was not finally ratified by tribal members until 1976.

== Design ==
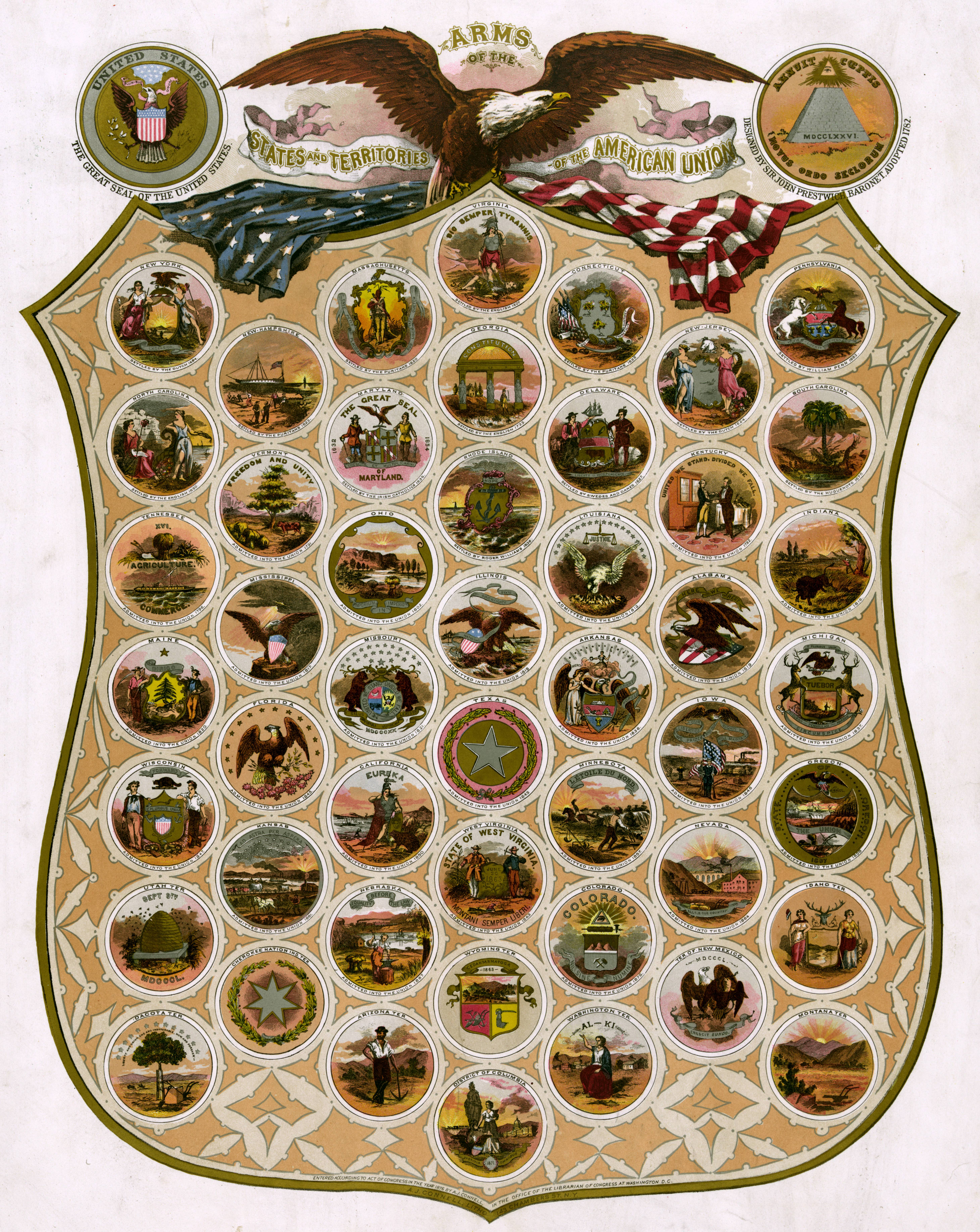
This collection of United States Seals was registered by the Library of Congress in 1876. When enlarged, there is a seal towards the lower-left corner representing the Cherokee Nation with the words "Cherokee Nation Ind. Ter." included as the label.

A flag for the new nation was designed by Stanley John, and approved by the Cherokee Tribal Council on October 9, 1978. The flag has an orange field with the "Great Seal of the Cherokee Nation" at its center. The seal is surrounded by seven yellow stars with seven points. Each of the stars points toward the star in the center of the seal. The seven-pointed stars represent the seven clans of the Cherokee.

The current version comes the flag being modified in a resolution passed by the council on September 9, 1989. Then, a black seven-pointed star was added to the upper right-hand corner of the flag to represent the light that went out with the deaths of those who perished on the Trail of Tears. The official flag also has a green-and-black rope edging.

The Cherokee script in the central seal reads: "Tsa la gi yi A ye hli" (translation: "Cherokee Nation").

== Historic flags ==
=== Peace Flag ===
Oral tradition states that the earliest Cherokee flag was the Cherokee Peace Flag, which had seven red stars with seven points, arranged in the form of the Big Dipper asterism on a white field. Tradition also states the Cherokee War Flag was the same design as the Peace Flag but with the colors inverted.

=== Confederate Flags ===
In the 1860s, Cherokee Confederate troops, part of the Indian cavalry, carried battle flags adapted from the first Confederate States flag, most notably the Cherokee Braves Flag of the 1st Cherokee Mounted Rifles. One was captured at the Battle of Locust Grove. It displayed the original Stars and Bars with the addition of five red stars in the center of the white stars. The red stars represented the Five Civilized Tribes, who were aligned with the Confederate States. The center red star represented the Cherokee Nation.

Cherokee Peace Flag

National Color of the 1st Cherokee Mounted Rifles

== Current ==
The flag used by the Cherokee Nation of Oklahoma is not the same as that used Eastern Band of Cherokee, as their seals differ.

== See also ==
- Cherokee Clans
