= Black American Heritage Flag =

Heritage flag for Black Americans

- Use: Ethnic flag
- Proportion: 2:3 or 3:5
- Adopted: March 5, 1967; 59 years ago
- Design: One diagonal black stripe centered between two red stripes. Superimposed on the black stripe is a blunted sword surrounded by a golden wreath of fig leaves.
- Designed by: Melvin Charles, Gleason T. Jackson

The Black American Heritage Flag, is an ethnic flag that represents the culture and history of Black American people. Each color and symbol on the flag has a significant meaning that was developed to instil pride in Black Americans, and provide them with a symbol of hope for the future in the midst of their struggle for Civil Rights.

== Design ==
Melvin Charles described the story behind the design of the Black American Heritage Flag and the historic event when it was raised at City Hall.

"We came up with this idea to make a flag that had diagonal stripes of red and black," he explained, "and to have a fig wreath circled in the center of it, and a blunted sword. Of course, we had to recognize that each item, we had to have some sort of explanation."

The gold-colored blunted sword represent "the feeling of having pride and also knowing, when you have a blunted sword, when you blunt it you learn to curdle the earth," he continued, "the wreath, which we also had in the color gold" symbolized peace, prosperity, and everlasting life. Red was chosen to represent the "rich blood we shed for freedom, justice, and human dignity, and the color black was for the pride in our pigmentation."

== History ==
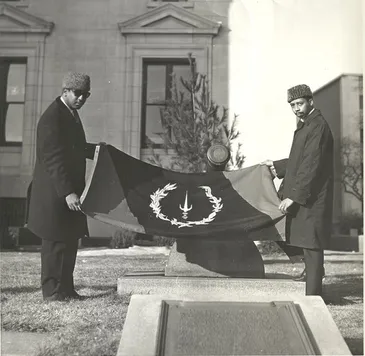
Melvin Charles & Gleason T. Jackson holding the flag outside of the Union County Courthouse in Elizabeth, NJ (1967)

The flag was created in 1967 by Melvin Charles and Gleason T. Jackson. The idea to create the flag came about during the civil rights era when Charles realized that every other group of people had a flag at parades except Black Americans. He saw how connected they were to their national flags, but did not feel the same connection towards the American flag due to the negative historical and political implication that the American flag held in the minds of Black American people. Creating a national flag was still just an idea in his mind until he pitched the idea to Gleason T. Jackson. He designed the flag alongside Jackson and they would later travel the country to visit various churches, schools, and public events to promote the flag.

The inspiration for the flag came from Melvin Charles and Gleason Jackson bouncing ideas off of each other and going to the library for extra inspiration for the flag's design and symbolism. The flag is said to have received some opposition from some people, but was eventually accepted and supported by the mayor, and was officially hoisted onto a flagpole at the city hall in Newark, New Jersey, on March 5, 1967. In December 1967, Charles and Jackson received acknowledgement of the flag from President Lyndon B. Johnson. The letter was signed by the Personal Secretary to the President of the United States. The Black church did not accept the flag as much, but most of Charles and Gleason's success came from contacting municipalities to showcase and spread the knowledge of the flag's existence.

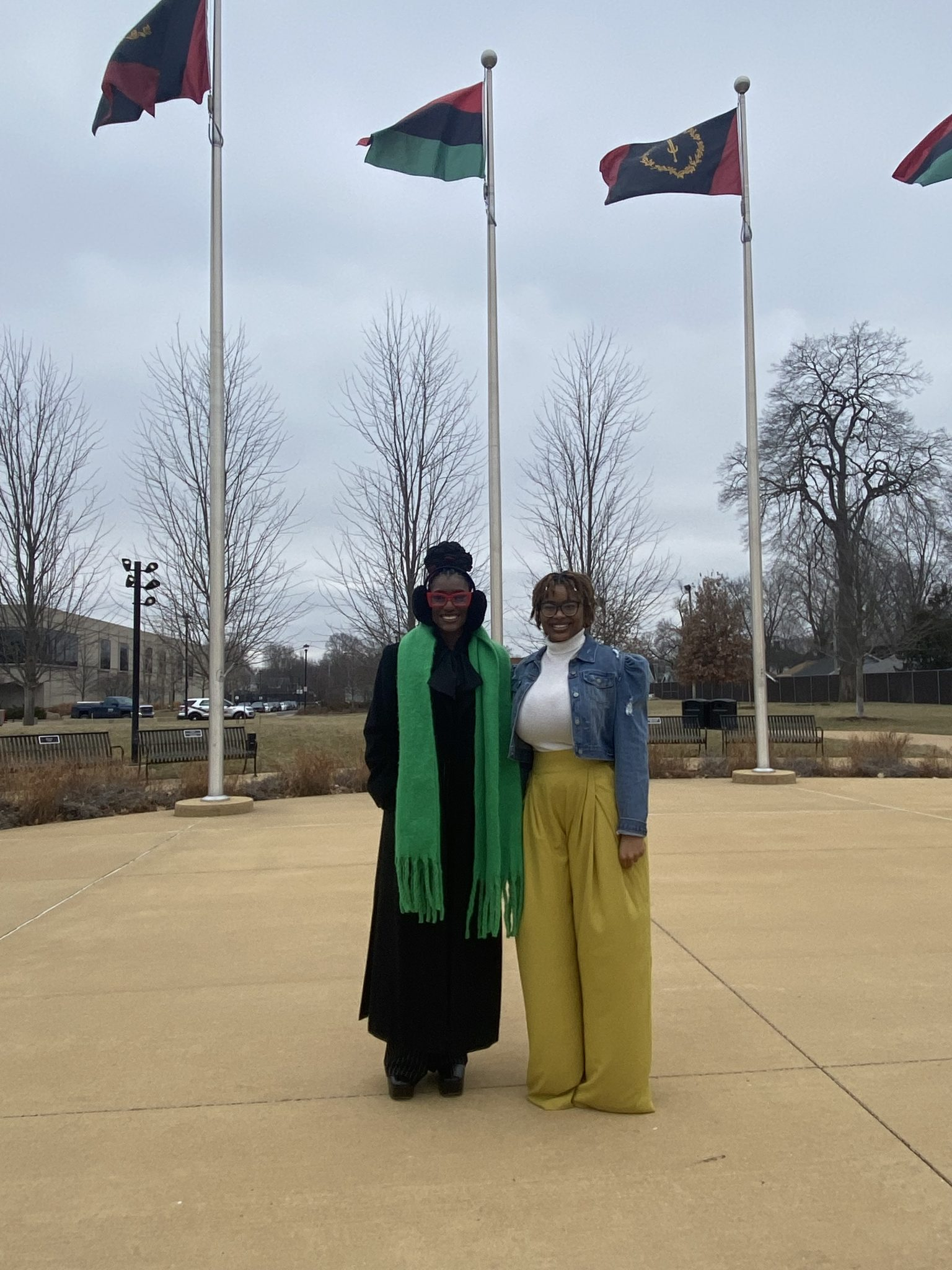
Two students pose in front of Black-American Heritage flags & Pan-African Flags in honor of Black History Month 2023

The heavy usage and discussion of the Black American Heritage flag amidst the 2020 George Floyd protests eventually led to increased recognition of the flag and its colors all over the country. In August 2021, graphic designer Michael Randall (known as Mike Tré) recreated a more accurate and high-quality representation of the original flag as designed by Charles and Jackson. In September 2021, a popular half Black-American rapper named Saweetie attended the Met Gala and wore a custom Christian Cowan gown that showcased the colors of the Black American Heritage Flag alongside the colors of the Filipino flag to represent both parts of her multi-ethnic background. Keerah Yeowang won the United States of America Ms. 2022 Pageant with a dress based on the flag.

== Ceremonial rites ==
After a newspaper article was written in the local paper, Melvin and Gleason began to receive a lot of attention and interest from Black Americans in the community. They fell upon the realization that they had very little to offer people in terms of tangible information about the flag. They decided to create a brochure with information about the flag's design, meaning, and purpose. In Charles's book The Rallying Point, he described the process of creating the brochure that resulted in the creation of a pledge for the flag as a final touch.

"It was intended to be a call to black people to rise, like the phoenix, from the ashes of slavery, the agony of caricatures and stereotypes, the self-destruction of rioting and looting, and the horrors of assassinations and senseless death. Rise, rise in spirit, rise in commitment to the struggle for equal justice and human dignity under the constitution, rise in pride in self that did not require processed hair, self denigration, or flinching from the word "black"".
