= Lorenza =

Lorenza is a given name. Notable people with the name include:

- Lorenza Agoncillo (1890–1972), daughter of the principal seamstress of the first and official Philippine flag
- Lorenza Alessandrini (born 1990), Italian ice dancer who began representing France internationally in 2015
- Lorenza Arnetoli (born 1974), Italian basketball player
- Lorenza Ramírez de Arellano (1906–1970), the first wife of former Governor of Puerto Rico Luis A. Ferré
- Lorenza Arnetoli (born 1974), Italian basketball player
- Lorenza Avemanay, indigenous Ecuadorian who led an 1803 revolt against the Spanish occupation in Guamote
- María Lorenza Barreneche (1926–2016), Argentine public figure and wife of the late President Raúl Alfonsín
- Lorenza Bernot (born 1988), Mexican beauty pageant contestant who competed in the Miss International 2008 pageant
- Lorenza Bonaccorsi (born 1968), Italian politician
- Lorenza Borrani (born 1983), Italian violinist
- Lorenza Böttner (1959–1994), Chilean–German disabled transgender multidisciplinary visual artist
- Lorenza Cobb (1888–1953), American baseball catcher in the Negro leagues
- Lorenza Jordan Cole (1897–1994), American pianist and music educator
- Lorenza Colzato (born 1974), Italian cognitive psychologist
- Lorenza Correa (1773–1831), Spanish stage actress and opera singer
- Lorenza De Noni (born 2006), Italian middle-distance runner
- Lorenza Guerrieri (born 1944), Italian actress
- Lorenza Haynes (1820–1899), American librarian, minister, school founder, suffragist, and writer
- Lorenza Indovina (born 1966), Italian actress
- Lorenza Izzo (born 1989), Chilean actress and model
- Lorenza Jachia (born 1968), Italian former professional tennis player
- Lorenza Jordan Cole (1897–1994), American concert pianist and music educator
- Lorenza Mario (born 1969), Italian dancer, actress and television personality
- Lorenza Matute, Equatoguinean politician
- Lorenza Mazzetti (1927–2020), Italian film director, novelist, photographer and painter
- Lorenza Morfín (born 1982), road cyclist from Mexico
- Lorenza Ponce, American violinist and string arranger
- Lorenza Saitta (born 1944), retired Italian computer scientist
- Lorenza Trucchi (1922–2026), Italian journalist and art critic
- Lorenza Vigarani (born 1969), Italian Olympic backstroke swimmer
- Lorenza Villegas de Santos (1899–1960), the wife of the 15th President of Colombia, Eduardo Santos Montejo
- Lorenza Viola, Italian-US theoretical physicist

== See also ==
- Euterpia lorenza, a butterfly in the family Pieridae
- Lorena (disambiguation)
- Lorentzian (disambiguation)
- Lorenz
- Lorenzana
- Lorenzia
- Lorenzo (disambiguation)
