= Eileen Abdulrashid =

American artist

- Born: California, U.S.
- Other names: Eileen Nelson, Eileen Abdul-Rashid
- Education: School of the Art Institute of Chicago; American Academy of Art College; Illinois Institute of Technology

Eileen Abdulrashid (also known as Eileen Nelson) is an American artist and craftsperson who is known for her work in enamel on copper.

== Early life and family ==
Eileen Abdulrashid is African-American, she grew up in California, and then spent time in Illinois. Her cousin is the artist Senga Nengudi.

Abdulrashid studied at the School of the Art Institute of Chicago, the American Academy of Art in Chicago (now known as American Academy of Art College), and the Institute of Design in Chicago (which merged to become the Illinois Institute of Technology in 1949).

== Career ==
Abdulrashid is known for being a part of the first exhibition of contemporary African-American women artists in the United States, Sapphire: You've Come a Long Way, Baby held at Suzanne Jackson's Gallery 32 in Los Angeles in 1970. Other participating artists included Betye Saar, Gloria Bohanon, Suzanne Jackson, Yvonne Cole Meo, and Senga Nengudi (listed as "S. Irons"). She also held a solo show at Gallery 32 in 1970, The Structural Flow of Our Environment: Eileen Abdulrashid.

Abdulrashid was one of nineteen artists featured in the Mills College Art Gallery-organized, traveling exhibition 1970 California Black Craftsmen (1970), alongside Gloria Bohanon, Sheryle Butler, Hubert Collins, Dale Brockman Davis, Ibibio Fundi, Manuel Gomez, Vernita Henderson, Ernest Leroy Herbert, Ben James, Bob Jefferson, Doyle Lane, William Maxwell, Evangeline Montgomery, John Outterbridge, Donald R. Stinson, Carole Ward, Curtis Tann, and Harry S. Richardson. She attended the National Conference of Artists in New York with artists David Hammons, Betye Saar, and Dan Concholar in 1973.

Abdulrashid has exhibited at a number of galleries in both Chicago and Los Angeles. In Chicago she has shown works at the Art Institute, Fie Gallery, H. Horner Gallery, South Side Art Center, Arts Gallery, and the East Gallery. Los Angeles venues have included the Brockman Gallery, Gallery 32, and the Central 1015 Gallery. At an exhibition at the Foyer Gallery in the Marin County Civic Center in 1975, her works included paintings, drawings, sculpture, and enamel-work, and they incorporated a wide variety of materials.
