= Lorentzian =

Lorentzian may refer to

- Cauchy distribution, also known as the Lorentz distribution, Lorentzian function, or Cauchy–Lorentz distribution
- Lorentz lineshape (spectroscopy)
- Lorentz transformation
- Lorentzian manifold

== See also ==
- Lorentz (disambiguation)
- Lorenz (disambiguation), spelled without the 't'
