= Yvonne Cole Meo =

African American female Artist

Yvonne Olivia Cole Meo (1923–2016) was an African American artist known primarily for sculpture and printmaking. Born in Seattle, Washington, Meo lived in Southern California for most of her life, primarily in Altadena.

== Education and work life ==
Meo received her Bachelor of Arts from University of California, Los Angeles and her Masters from California State College.

Meo taught art at Fisk University and Van Nuys Senior High School in Van Nuys, California in the late 1950s and through the 1960s.

== Career ==
Meo was encouraged by Charles White to show her work in galleries in Los Angeles during the 1960s. She exhibited at Le Dilettante in 1965.

Meo was featured at The Sapphire Show (1970), the first survey of African American women artists in Los Angeles and, likely, the United States, along with Gloria Bohanon, Suzanne Jackson, Betye Saar, Senga Nengudi (formerly Sue Irons) and Eileen Nelson (formerly Eileen Abdulrashid). This collaborative project was staged over the Independence Day weekend in 1970 at Gallery 32, an experimental space run by Suzanne Jackson from her loft in the Mediterranean Revival Granada Buildings in Los Angeles from 1969 to 1970. The show lasted only five days but was an integral moment for African American women artists and the growing Black Arts Movement in Los Angeles. Following The Sapphire Show was a solo exhibition by Meo, at the conclusion of Gallery 32's run. Meo's work was later featured along with six other artists in Sapphire Show, You've Come a Long Way Baby, The Sapphire Show (2021), organized and exhibited at Ortuzar Projects in New York, New York.

Meo was part of the 1977 "art critic and historian collective Witness, Inc."

She later showed in the 1994 "Take 2" exhibition at the Fisher Gallery at the University of Southern California organized in collaboration with the California Afro-American Museum and LAX/94.

Meo was included in African American artists in Los Angeles sponsored by the City of Los Angeles, Department of Cultural Affairs. This was a three-part exhibition covering 60 years of art: Reaction 1945–60 held at Los Angeles Municipal Art Gallery, January 21–April 10, 2005; Pathways 1966–89 held at California African American Museum and Los Angeles Municipal Art Gallery, January 13–April 10, 2005; Fade 1990–2003 held at Craft and Folk Art Museum, Luckman Gallery at Cal State L.A., and University Fine Art Gallery at Cal State L.A., January 16–February 28, 2004.

In addition, her works have been exhibited at several galleries including the Ankrum Gallery, Westwood Art Association Gallery, The Graphic International Exhibit in Leipzig, Germany, the UCLA Print Show, the Redondo Beach Art Festival, the Hollywood Bowl, the Pasadena Art Festival, the Fine Arts Gallery of San Diego, and the Oakland Art Museum.

== Catalogues and Archives ==
- African American artists in Los Angeles: a survey, exhibition
- Black Artists on Art by Samella Lewis and Ruth Waddy (vol I)
- Contemporary Afro-American Women Artists exhibition records, 1969–1978, Smithsonian Museum
- The Family Bond and Dancers Archives of American Art, Smithsonian Museum
- South of Pico; African American Artists in Los Angeles in the 1960s and 1970s, Duke University Press
- Oakland Museum Permanent collection
- Online Archive of California

== Auction ==
Yvonne Cole Meo's work has been offered at auction multiple times. Among the artist's sold works is Cotton is Still King #4, which realized US$1,000 at Swann Auction Galleries in 2017

== Family life ==
Born Yvonne Olivia Cole, she married businessman Eugene Meo in 1959. She was the daughter of concert pianist Lorenza Jordan Cole.
