= Evangeline Montgomery =

American sculptor (1930–2025)

- Born: Evangeline Juliet Montgomery; May 2, 1930; New York City, U.S.
- Died: May 1, 2025 (aged 94)
- Education: California College of the Arts
- Known for: Printmaking, Metalwork
- Notable work: Ancestral boxes, Colorful lithographs

Evangeline Juliet Montgomery (May 2, 1930 – May 1, 2025) was an American artist. Known primarily for her metal work, she has also worked as a printmaker, lithographer and curator. She received the Women's Caucus for Art Lifetime Achievement Award in 1999.

Art historian Floyd Coleman has said she "is an important figure in American art. She has a long career of participating and assuming leadership in progressive causes that promoted the arts and the development of community." He describes her as a politically active artist, arts administrator and activist.

== Early life ==
Born in New York City, Montgomery was the daughter of Oliver Thompson, a Baptist minister, and Carmelite Thompson, a homemaker. She discovered her artistic talents and love of painting early, after receiving an oil painting set at age 14. After graduating from Seward Park High School, Montgomery worked painting faces on dolls and religious statues. Montgomery moved to Los Angeles in 1955 with her husband, where she worked for Thomas Usher, an African American jewelry designer.

She received her B.F.A. from the California College of Arts and Crafts in 1969, where she specialized in metallurgy. After graduating, she worked as an independent curator and consultant from 1967 until 1979. She was a "Black Art" consultant for Rainbow Sign, an active black cultural center in Berkeley, California.

== Career ==
Working as a curator Montgomery was an arts advocate, fighting for greater representation of African American artists. Appointed as an Ethnic Art Consultant at the Oakland Museum, Montgomery successfully organized eight exhibitions of established and emerging Black artists, including a 1971 retrospective of African American sculptor Sargent Johnson (1887-1967) and a 1970 exhibition on California Black Craftsmen that featured nineteen artists including Eileen Abdulrashid, Gloria R. Bohanon, Sheryle Butler, Hubert Collins, Dale Brockman Davis, Ibibio Fundi, Manuel Gomez, Vernita Henderson, Ernest Leroy Herbert, Ben James, Bob Jefferson, Doyle Lane, William Maxwell, Evangeline Montgomery, John Outterbridge, Donald R. Stinson, Carole Ward, Curtis Tann, and Harry S. Richardson. Montgomery had discovered a “trove of untouched documents” on Johnson, an artist who was active during the Harlem Renaissance. The retrospective helped to establish Johnson's legacy in African American art.

In 1980 Montgomery moved to Washington, DC, to work as community affairs director for WHMM-TV. In 1983, Montgomery started working for the US State Department's Arts America Program. Under the Arts America Program, Montgomery fostered successful fine art programs both in the United States and internationally. As a curator, Montgomery organized more than 200 exhibitions.

In 2005, Blacks in Government (BIG) started the Evangeline J. Montgomery Scholarship Fund which has given out more than $40,000 in scholarships.

== Art ==
As an artist, Montgomery worked with a variety of mediums, including weaving and textile design, metalsmithing, acrylic and gouache, photography, and finally printmaking, creating both editions and monoprints.

Her worked metal ancestral boxes are made of sterling silver and incorporate materials such as semi-precious stones and found objects. Montgomery has said these boxes are meant "to hold something precious" and reflect her explorations of the role of memory and memorials in human history. One of her first boxes, “Ancestor Box 1: Justice for Angela” was made in 1971 in response to the trial of political activist Angela Davis, it incorporates the Ashanti symbol for justice. Another major work, "Red, Black and Green Ancestral Box - Garvey Box" (1973), is cast in sterling silver with enamel in red, black, and green to evoke the memory of Marcus Garvey.

A diagnosis of Parkinson's disease made it difficult for Montgomery to keep working with metal, leading her to focus on printmaking.

Montgomery describes her artistic process and inspiration, “My visual ideas are expressed abstractly by creating geometrical compositions with overlays of textured forms. In this process, new color configurations emerge. My inspiration for color development has always been interpreting the transparencies found in nature—its nuances and richness of surfaces, textures, and brilliant color whether in plants, water, stone, and incredible variation of life forms.”

Montgomery has exhibited her work in various solo and group shows in museums and galleries across the United States, including Delaware, Maryland, DC, Pennsylvania, Virginia, Michigan, New Jersey, Louisiana, Florida, and New York. Many of her works are part of such private collections and permanent museum collections as the Paul Jones Collection of the University of Delaware, Oakland Museum of California, The Diane Whitfield-Locke and Carnell Locke Collection, the Los Angeles Board of Education, Philadelphia Museum of Art, the Ruth Chandler Collection of California, and Library of Congress. For the last years of her life she lived in Rockville, Maryland, in an assisted-living facility.

Montgomery died on May 1, 2025, at the age of 94, a day before her 95th birthday. Later that year, her work was included and part of the major "Women Artists of the DMV" survey show at the American University Art Museum at the Katzen curated by F. Lennox Campello.
