= Saitta =

Saitta is a surname. Notable people with the surname include:

- Davide Saitta (born 1987), Italian volleyball player
- Lorenza Saitta (born 1944), Italian computer scientist
- Nancy Saitta, American attorney and judge
