= Twenty Million Sweethearts =

1934 film by Ray Enright

- Theatrical release poster
- Directed by: Ray Enright
- Written by: Paul Finder Moss; Jerry Wald
- Starring: Pat O'Brien; Dick Powell; Ginger Rogers
- Cinematography: Sidney Hickox
- Edited by: Clarence Kolster
- Music by: Harry Warren
- Distributed by: First National Pictures; Warner Bros. Pictures
- Release date: May 26, 1934
- Running time: 89 minutes
- Country: United States
- Language: English
- Budget: $202,000
- Box office: $1,213,000

Twenty Million Sweethearts is a 1934 American Pre-Code musical comedy film directed by Ray Enright and starring Pat O'Brien, Dick Powell, Ginger Rogers, and the Mills Brothers. The film was remade in 1949 as My Dream Is Yours.

== Plot ==
Agent Russell Edward "Rush" Blake is able to promote the singing tenor waiter Buddy Clayton as a major radio star, while Buddy's wife Peggy Cornell loses out. In the end, Peggy does not lose Buddy to his "twenty million sweethearts" – his female fans.

== Cast ==
- Pat O'Brien as Russell Edward "Rush" Blake
- Dick Powell as Buddy Clayton
- Ginger Rogers as Peggy Cornell
- Ted Fio Rito as himself
- Allen Jenkins as Uncle Pete
- Grant Mitchell as Chester A. Sharpe
- Joseph Cawthorn as Mr. Herbert "Herbie" Brokman
- Joan Wheeler as Marge, the Receptionist
- Henry O'Neill as Lemuel Tappan
- Johnny Arthur as Norma Hanson's Secretary
- The Mills Brothers as themselves
- The Radio Rogues as themselves
- George Chandler as Johnny Klinger, radio columnist (uncredited)

== Music ==
The film features the well-known song "I'll String Along with You" by Harry Warren and Al Dubin.

== Reception ==
The film was considered a box-office disappointment for Warner Bros. According to studio records, it earned $821,000 domestically and $392,000 overseas.
