= Desirable (film) =

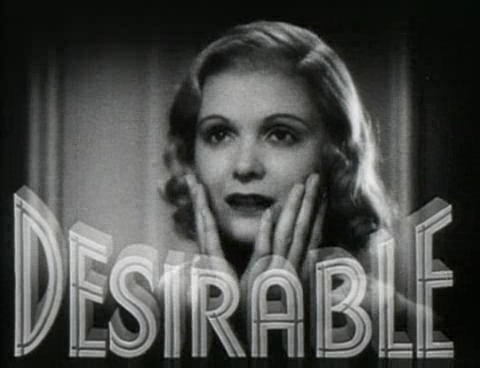
- Jean Muir in Desirable
- Directed by: Archie Mayo
- Written by: Mary C. McCall Jr.
- Produced by: Edward Chodorov
- Starring: George Brent; Jean Muir
- Cinematography: Ernest Haller
- Edited by: Thomas Pratt
- Music by: Ray Heindorf; Bernhard Kaun; Heinz Roemheld
- Distributed by: Warner Bros. Pictures
- Release date: September 8, 1934
- Running time: 68 min.
- Country: United States
- Language: English

Desirable is a 1934 American drama film directed by Archie Mayo and starring Jean Muir and George Brent. It was released by Warner Bros. Pictures. The film follows the story of Lois (Jean Muir), the 19-year-old daughter of a famous actress (Verree Teasdale), who has been hidden away at boarding school to protect her mother's image. A scarlet-fever quarantine sends her home to New York City, full of innocent enthusiasm, only to be betrayed by her mother, by the arrogant egotists of her mother's theatrical world and by the haughty social snobs in the upper-crust family whose son her mother persuades her to marry. Mac (George Brent), a friend of her mother's, initially plays an avuncular role. By the end of the film, Lois and Mac realize that they are in love.

== Plot ==
Helen Walbridge is a famous actress who does not want her true age to be known. She, therefore, keeps her 19-year-old daughter secreted away in a boarding school.

== Cast ==
- Verree Teasdale as Helen Walbridge
- Jean Muir as Lois Johnson
- George Brent as Stuart 'Mac' McAllister
- John Halliday as Austin Stevens
- Charles Starrett as Russell 'Russ' Gray
- Russell Hopton as Chet
- Joan Wheeler as Barbara, 'Babs'
- Barbara Leonard as Margaret, Gray's Maid
- Virginia Hammond as Mrs. Emily Gray
- Pauline True as Mac's Secretary
