= Itaballia marana =

Scientific classification
- Kingdom: Animalia
- Phylum: Arthropoda
- Clade: Pancrustacea
- Class: Insecta
- Order: Lepidoptera
- Family: Pieridae
- Genus: Itaballia
- Species: I. marana

Binomial name
- Itaballia marana (Doubleday, 1844)

Synonyms
- Pieris marana Doubleday, 1844

Species of butterfly

Itaballia marana is a butterfly in the family Pieridae. It is found in Ecuador.

The larvae possibly feed on the leaves of Capparis species.
