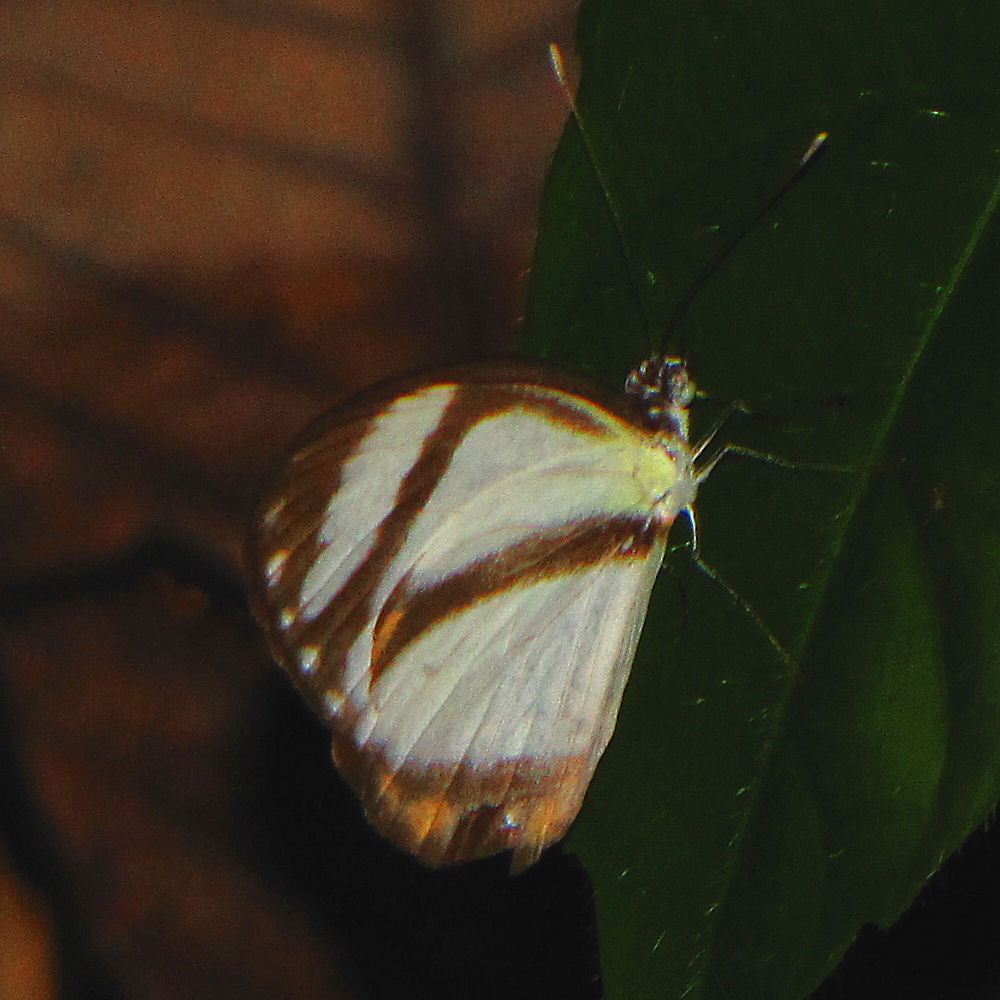
- Pisonis mimic (Itaballia pandosia), Tambopata Park, Peru

Scientific classification
- Kingdom: Animalia
- Phylum: Arthropoda
- Clade: Pancrustacea
- Class: Insecta
- Order: Lepidoptera
- Family: Pieridae
- Tribe: Pierini
- Genus: Itaballia; Kaye, 1904

Species
- Three, see text

= Itaballia =

Butterfly genus in family Pieridae

Itaballia is a genus of butterflies in the family Pieridae found in Central and South America.

== Species ==
Listed alphabetically:

- Itaballia demophile (Linnaeus, 1763) – crossbarred white, cross-barred white, or black-banded white
- Itaballia marana (Doubleday, 1844)
- Itaballia pandosia (Hewitson, 1853) – Pisonis mimic, brown-bordered white
