= Joan Wheeler =

American actress (1913–2001)

Joan Wheeler Ankrum
- Born: Joan Natalia Wheeler; January 8, 1913; Palo Alto, California, U.S.
- Died: December 20, 2001 (aged 88); Los Angeles, California, U.S.
- Occupation(s): Actress, art gallery owner
- Years active: 1933–1937
- Spouses: Morris Ankrum (m. 1935; died 1964) William Challee (m. 1984; died 1989)

Joan Wheeler Ankrum (January 8, 1913 – December 20, 2001) was an American film actress and founder of the Ankrum Gallery on La Cienega Boulevard in Los Angeles.

== Life and career ==
Ankrum was born Joan Natalia Wheeler on January 8, 1913, in Palo Alto, California. Ankrum had one older sister and two younger brothers.

She got her start in acting with Pasadena Playhouse, where she met her husband, character actor Morris Ankrum. They were married on August 16, 1935, in Benbow, California, and had two sons, David and Cary. Morris Ankrum died in 1964.

In 1960, Ankrum founded Ankrum Gallery, which was located on La Cienega Boulevard next to a number of other galleries. Joseph Hirshhorn contributed some of the initial funding for the gallery, and went on to be a loyal patron, along with his wife Olga Hirshhorn. Ankrum initially founded the gallery to show her nephew Morris Broderson's work, but the gallery then handled the artwork of other California artists, such as Helen Lundeberg, Richard Bauer, Hans Burkhard, Suzanne Jackson, Samella Lewis, and Lorser Feitelson. The Smithsonian Archives of American Art, which holds the gallery's archives, notes that Ankrum Gallery "was among the earliest to exhibit the work of black artists." A 1971 New York Times article about women gallery owners in Los Angeles noted that the Ankrum Gallery was "the largest in sales and size on La Cienega Boulevard" at the time.

In 1984, Ankrum married a co-owner and partner in Ankrum Gallery, actor William Challee.

Ankrum was a co-founder of Art Dealers Association of America, and an active member of the Black Arts Council. She also helped organize the Monday Night Art Walk program on La Cienega Boulevard. she died in 2001 at age 88.

== Broadway roles ==
- Growing Pains (1933) as Prudence
- Strangers at Home (1934) as Jean Crosby
- Western Waters (1937) as Penelope

== Selected filmography ==
- Madame Du Barry as Florette, Young Girl at Dear Park
- Desirable as Barbara, "Babs"
- The Merry Frinks as Lucille Frink... (Happy Family in the UK)
- Smarty as Mrs. Bonnie Durham... (Hit Me Again in the UK)
- Twenty Million Sweethearts as Marge, the Receptionist
