= Lorentz (disambiguation) =

Lorentz is a surname and a given name.

Lorentz may also refer to:

== Things named for Hendrik Lorentz ==
- Lorentz factor, Doppler effect
- Lorentz–Lorenz equation, regarding the refractive index of a substance discovered independently by Hendrik Lorentz and Ludvig Lorenz
- Lorentz force, the force exerted on a charged particle in an electromagnetic field
- Lorentz transformation, the formula that provides the mathematical backbone for Einstein's theory of special relativity
- The Lorentz group, the group containing all Lorentz transformations
- Lorentz–Cauchy distribution, a distribution used in fitting peaks in a spectrum
- Lorentz surface, a two-dimensional oriented smooth manifold with a conformal equivalence class of Lorentzian metrics. It is the analogue of a Riemann surface in indefinite signature
- Lorentz curve (disambiguation), various meanings
- Lorentz scalar, a scalar which is invariant under a Lorentz transformation
- Lorentz Institute, Instituut-Lorentz in Dutch, was established in 1921 and is the oldest institute for theoretical physics in The Netherlands

== Places ==
- Lorentz (crater), crater on the Moon
- Lorentz National Park, a national park in Indonesian New Guinea, named for Hendrikus Albertus Lorentz
- Lorentz River, located in Western New Guinea, Indonesia
- Lorentz, West Virginia

== Other uses ==
- Lorentz Medal, a prize awarded every four years by the Royal Netherlands Academy of Arts and Sciences
- Lorentz space, in mathematics, a function space named after the American mathematician George G. Lorentz.
- Lorentz catfish, a species of fish in the family Ariidae, the only member of the genus Tetranesodon, endemic to West Papua in Indonesia

== See also ==
- Lorenz (disambiguation)
