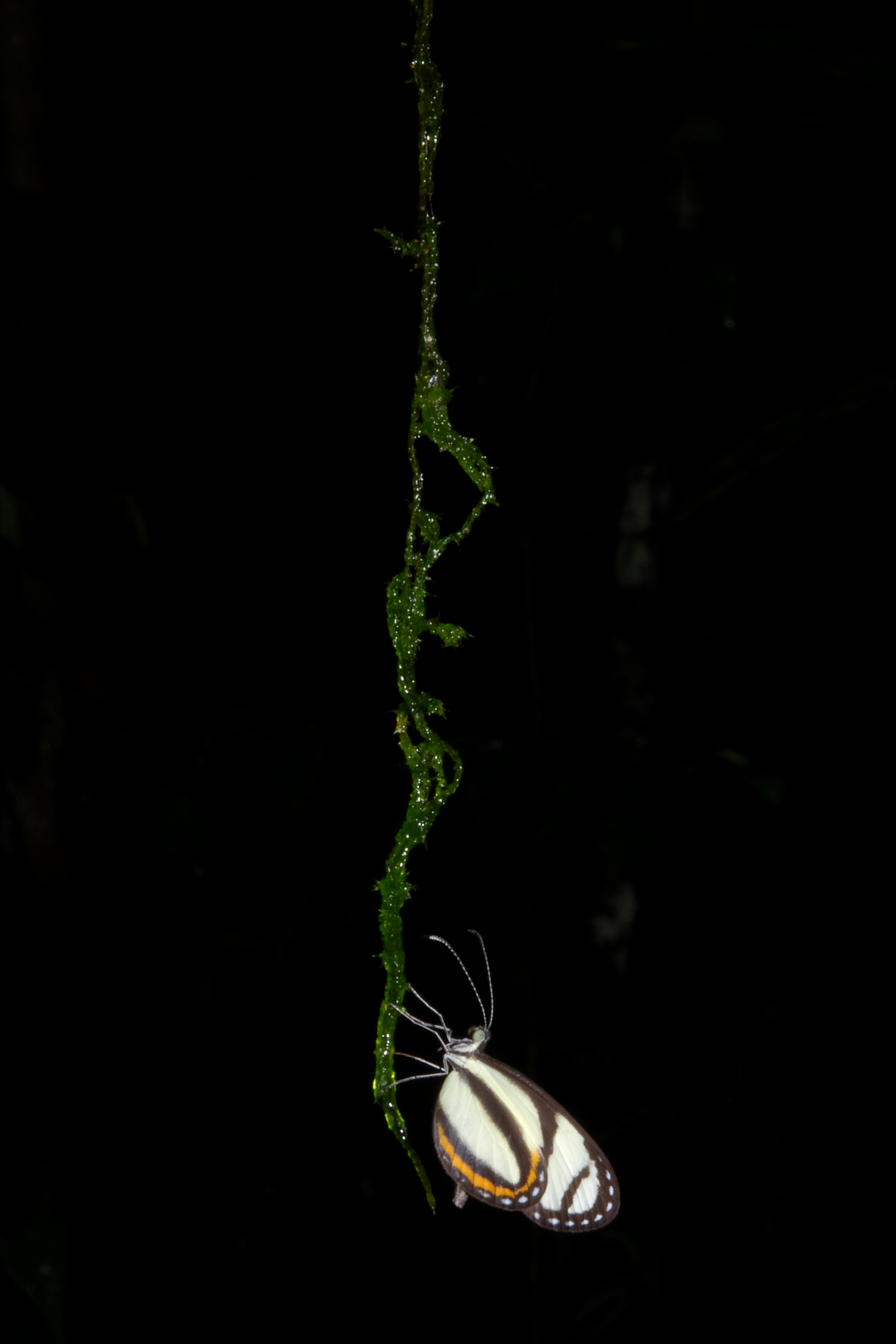

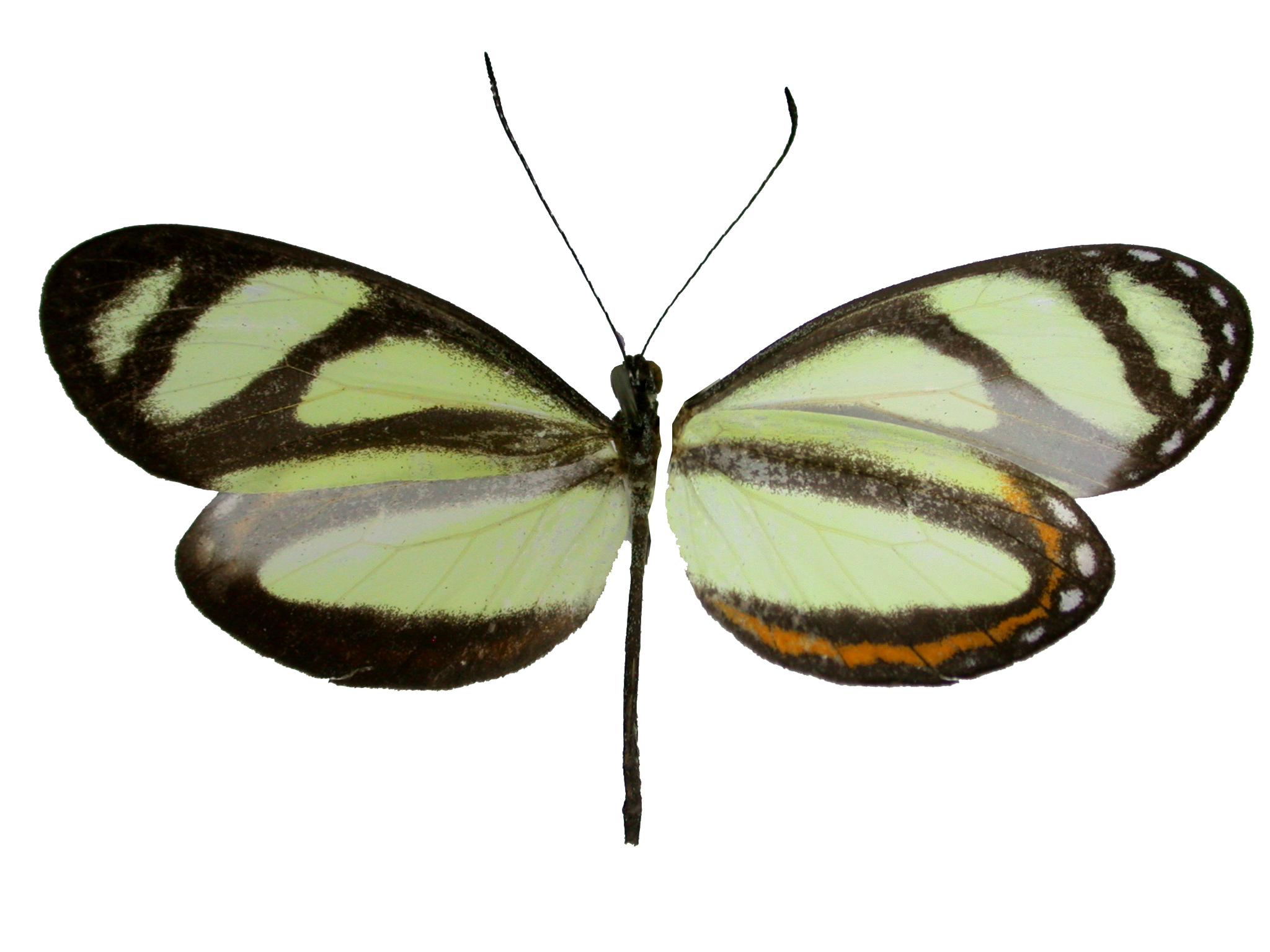

Scientific classification
- Kingdom: Animalia
- Phylum: Arthropoda
- Clade: Pancrustacea
- Class: Insecta
- Order: Lepidoptera
- Family: Pieridae
- Genus: Moschoneura; Butler, 1870
- Species: M. pinthous

Binomial name
- Moschoneura pinthous (Linnaeus, 1758)

Synonyms
- Papilio pinthous Linnaeus, 1758; Papilio eumelia Cramer, 1780; Papilio vocula Stoll, 1781; Pieris enodia Godart, 1819 (repl. name); Pieris methymna Godart, [1819]; Moschoneura theapina Butler, 1899; Dismorphia ithomia douglasina Bryk, 1953; Leptalis amelina Hopffer, 1874; Dismorphia pinthaeus gracilis Avinoff, 1926; Dismorphia pintharus proxima f. obscura Meier-Ramel, 1928

= Moschoneura =

Pinthous mimic white

Monotypic butterfly genus in family Pieridae

Moschoneura is a genus of butterflies in the family Pieridae. It contains only one species, Moschoneura pinthous, the pinthous mimic white, which is found in northern South America.

Adults mimic Scada karschina and other Ithomiini butterfly species.

== Subspecies ==
The following subspecies are recognised:

- M. p. pinthous (Suriname)
- M. p. methymna (Godart, 1819) (Brazil)
- M. p. cyra (Doubleday, 1844) (Brazil: Bahia)
- M. p. ela (Hewitson, 1877) (Ecuador)
- M. p. ithomia (Hewitson, 1867) (Ecuador, Peru)
- M. p. amelina (Hopffer, 1874) (Peru)
- M. p. proxima (Röber, 1924) (Brazil: Amazonas)
- M. p. patricia Lamas, 2004 (Peru)
- M. p. monica Lamas, 2004 (Peru)

== Gallery ==
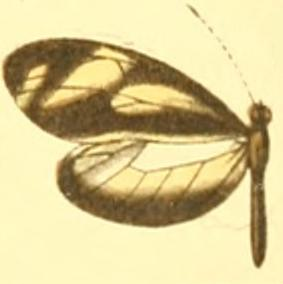
M. p. pinthous

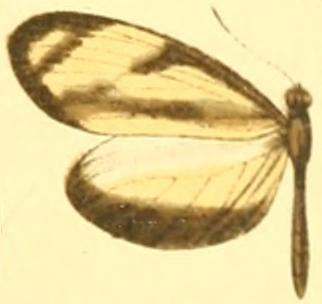
M. p. amelina male

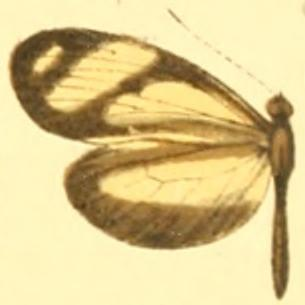
M. p. amelina female

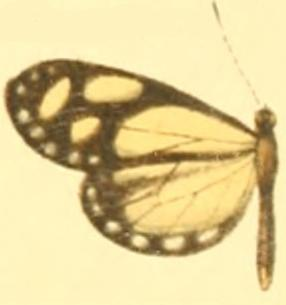
M. p. ithomia

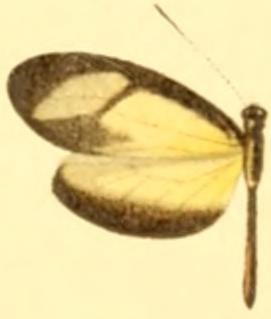
M. p. methymna
