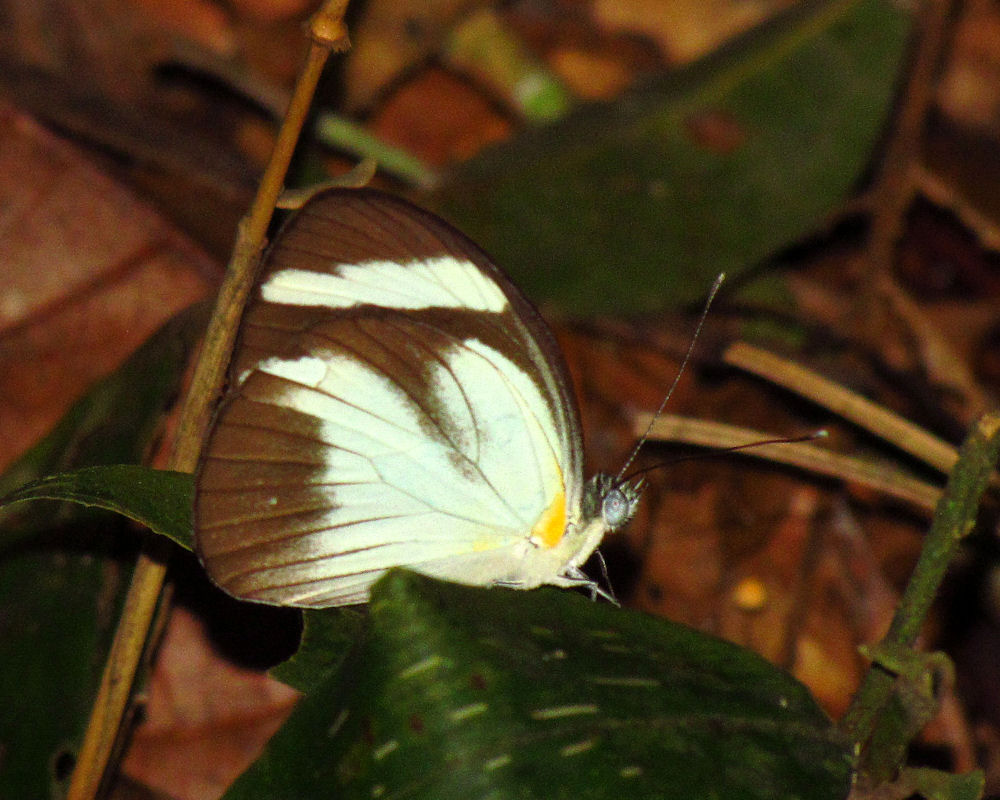
- I. d. lucania, Tambopata Park, Peru

Scientific classification
- Kingdom: Animalia
- Phylum: Arthropoda
- Class: Insecta
- Order: Lepidoptera
- Family: Pieridae
- Genus: Itaballia
- Species: I. demophile

Binomial name
- Itaballia demophile (Linnaeus, 1758)

Synonyms
- Papilio demophile Linnaeus, 1758; Haballia demophile; Papilio amathonte Cramer, 1777; Papilio molphea Cramer, 1777; Pieris calydonia Boisduval, 1836; Perrhybris demophile charopus Fruhstorfer, 1907; Perrhybris demophile minthe Fruhstorfer, 1907; Perrhybris demophile mustica Fruhstorfer, 1907; Perrhybris demophile f. niphates Fruhstorfer, 1907; Perrhybris demophile calydonia f. magna Fruhstorfer, 1907

= Itaballia demophile =

Cross-barred white

Species of butterfly

Itaballia demophile, the cross-barred white, crossbarred white, or black-banded white, is a butterfly in the family Pieridae. It is found from the southern United States, and Mexico to Paraguay. The habitat consists of disturbed areas including forest clearings, riverbanks, roadsides, fields, cattle pastures and wasteland.

The wingspan is 30–35 mm (1.2–1.4 in).

The larvae feed on the leaves of Capparis species, including Capparis indica, and Capparis frondosa.

== Subspecies ==
The following subspecies are recognized:

- I. d. calydonia (Boisduval, 1836) (Belize, Venezuela, Colombia)
- I. d. centralis Joicey & Talbot, 1928 (Guatemala, Honduras)
- I. d. charopus (Fruhstorfer, 1907) (Brazil: Amazonas)
- I. d. demophile (Linnaeus, 1758) (Guyana)
- I. d. huebneri Fruhstorfer, 1907 (Brazil)
- I. d. lucania (Fruhstorfer, 1907) (Peru, Ecuador, Bolivia)
- I. d. nimietes (Fruhstorfer, 1907) (Brazil: Bahia)
- I. d. niphates Fruhstorfer, 1907 (Brazil: Pará)
- I. d. niseias (Fruhstorfer, 1907) (Paraguay)
