= The Merry Frinks =

1934 film directed by Alfred Edward Green

- Directed by: Alfred E. Green
- Written by: Gene Markey; Kathryn Scola
- Produced by: Robert Lord; Hal B. Wallis
- Starring: Aline MacMahon; Guy Kibbee; Hugh Herbert
- Cinematography: Arthur Edeson
- Edited by: James Gibbon
- Music by: Bernhard Kaun
- Production company: First National Pictures
- Distributed by: Warner Bros. Pictures
- Release date: May 26, 1934
- Running time: 68 minutes
- Country: United States
- Language: English

The Merry Frinks is a 1934 American comedy film directed by Alfred E. Green and starring Aline MacMahon, Guy Kibbee and Hugh Herbert. It is also known by the alternative title of Happy Family.

== Plot ==
A put-upon mother inherits a fortune, on the condition that she abandon her deadbeat family. This spurs her family members to attempt to reform themselves in an effort to win her back.

== Cast ==
- Aline MacMahon as Hattie 'Mom' Frink
- Guy Kibbee as Uncle Newt Frink
- Hugh Herbert as Joe 'Poppa' Frink
- Allen Jenkins as Emmett Frink
- Helen Lowell as Amelia 'Grandma' Frink
- Joan Wheeler as Lucille Frink
- Frankie Darro as Norman Frink
- Ivan Lebedeff as Ramon Alvarez
- Harold Huber as Benny Lopez
- Louise Beavers as Camille, Hattie's Maid
- Maidel Turner as Mrs. Shinliver
- Harry Beresford as Mr. J. Harold Brumby
- Harry C. Bradley as Dr. Shinliver
- James Bush as Oliver Gilfin
- Charles Coleman as Witherspoon, Hattie's Butler
- Joan Sheldon as Frieda Shinliver
- Ethel Wales as United Charities Worker
- Edward Keane as Truant Officer
- Ivan Linow as Barkefky, the First Russian
- Michael Visaroff as Katzelmalov, the Second Russian
- Scotty Mattraw as Fat Man (uncredited)

== Bibliography ==
- Hanson, Philip. This Side of Despair: How the Movies and American Life Intersected During the Great Depression. Associated University Presse, 2008.
