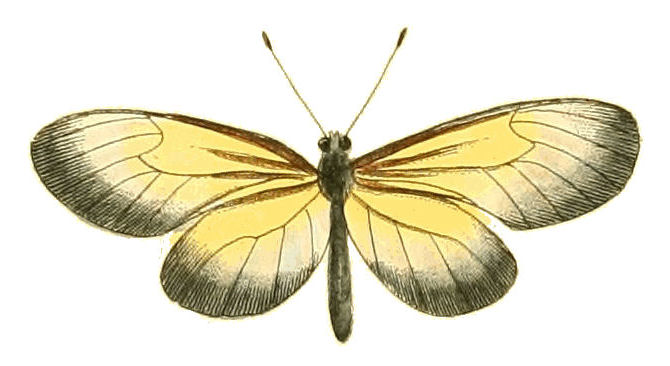
- Scada karschina

Scientific classification
- Domain: Eukaryota
- Kingdom: Animalia
- Phylum: Arthropoda
- Class: Insecta
- Order: Lepidoptera
- Family: Nymphalidae
- Tribe: Ithomiini
- Genus: Scada; Kirby, 1871

Species
- See text

Synonyms
- Salacia Hübner, 1823; Heteroscada Schatz, [1886]

= Scada =

Genus of brush-footed butterflies

Scada is a genus of clearwing (ithomiine) butterflies, named by William Forsell Kirby in 1871. They are in the brush-footed butterfly family, Nymphalidae.

== Species ==
Arranged alphabetically:

- Scada karschina (Herbst, 1792)
- Scada kusa (Hewitson, 1872)
- Scada reckia (Hübner, [1808])
- Scada zemira (Hewitson, 1856)
- Scada zibia (Hewitson, 1856)
