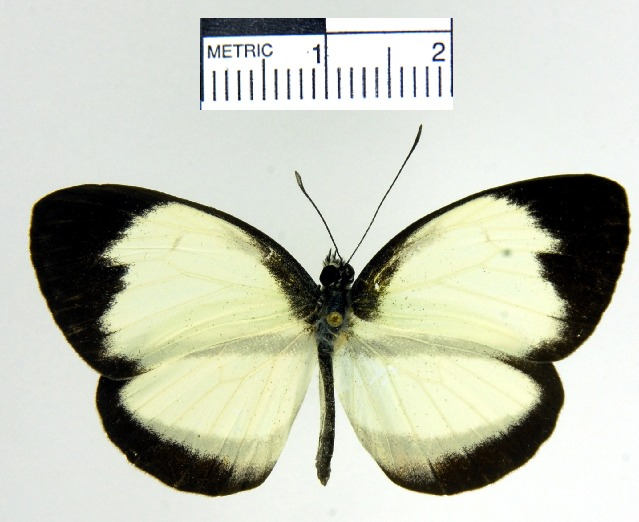
- Dorsal view
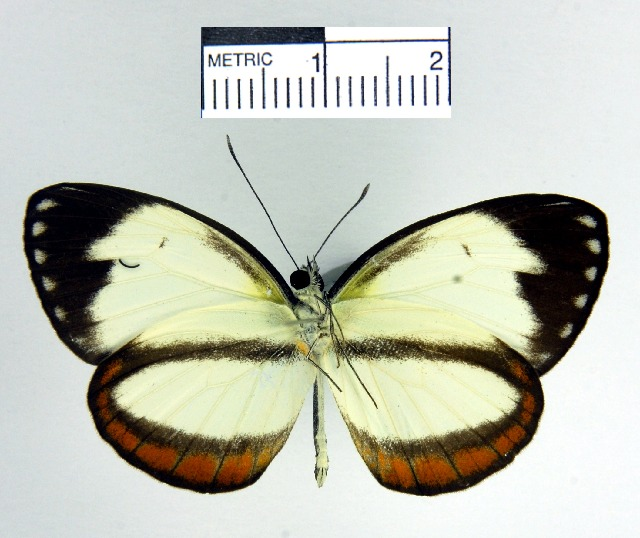
- Ventral view

Scientific classification
- Kingdom: Animalia
- Phylum: Arthropoda
- Class: Insecta
- Order: Lepidoptera
- Family: Pieridae
- Genus: Itaballia
- Species: I. pandosia

Binomial name
- Itaballia pandosia (Hewitson, 1853)

Synonyms
- Pieris pandosia Hewitson, [1853]; Pieris pisonis Hewitson, 1861; Pieris leptalina Bates, 1861; Perrhybris pandosia ophelia Fruhstorfer, 1907; Perrhybris pandosia ophelia f. ludovica Fruhstorfer, 1907; Pieris kicaha Reakirt, [1864]; Pieris notistriga Butler & H. Druce, 1872; Euterpia lorenza Ehrmann, 1920; Perrhybris pandosia sabata Fruhstorfer, 1907

= Itaballia pandosia =

Pisonis mimic

Species of butterfly

Itaballia pandosia, the Pisonis mimic or brown-bordered white, is a butterfly in the family Pieridae. It is found in the Amazonian regions of Brazil, Ecuador, Peru, and in Central America, Colombia and Venezuela. The habitat consists of primary rainforests. It may be a mimic of Moschoneura pinthous

The wingspan is about 50 mm (2.0 in).

The larvae possibly feed on the leaves of Capparis species.

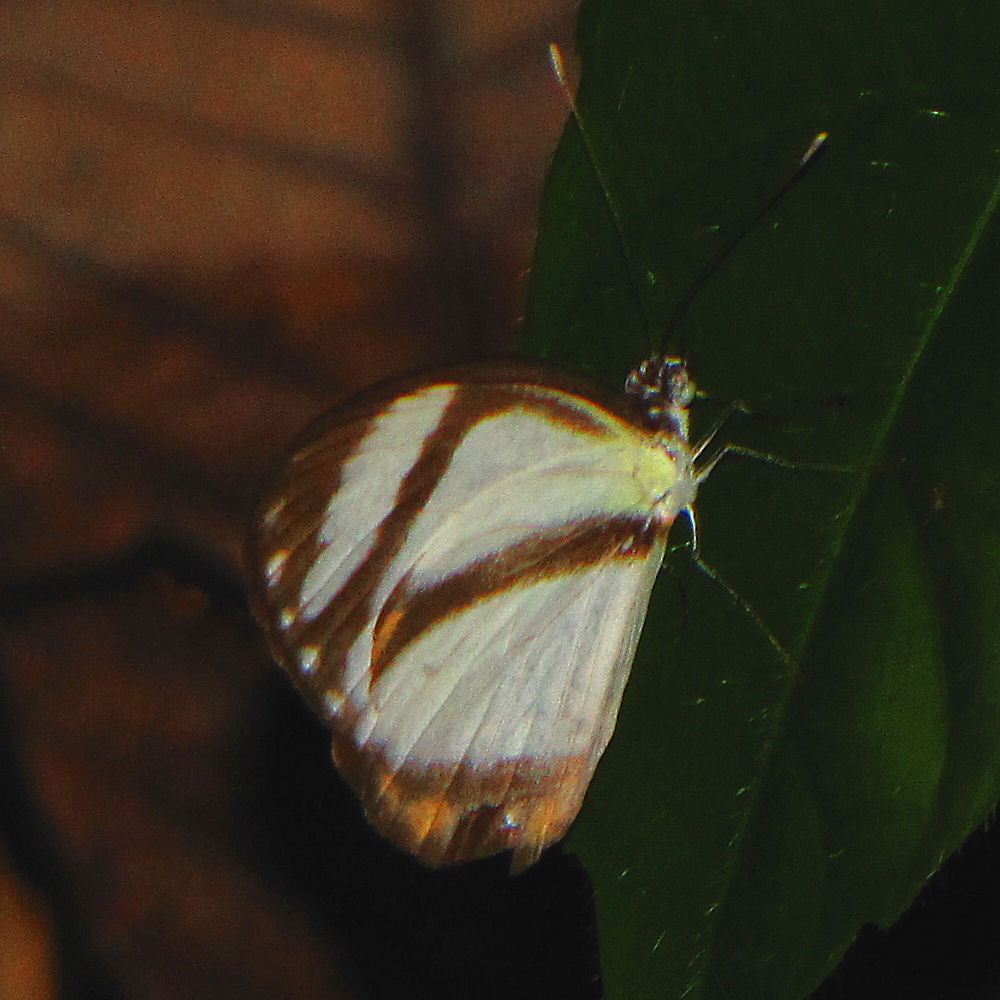
I. p. pisonis

== Subspecies ==
The following subspecies are recognised:

- I. p. pandosia (Venezuela, Trinidad)
- I. p. pisonis (Hewitson, 1861) (Ecuador, Peru, Brazil: Amazonas)
- I. p. kicaha (Reakirt, [1864]) (Honduras, Costa Rica, Panama, Guatemala)
- I. p. sabata (Fruhstorfer, 1907) (Colombia)
