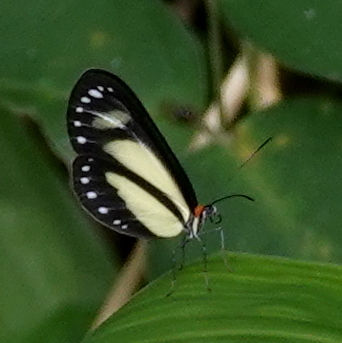

Scientific classification
- Domain: Eukaryota
- Kingdom: Animalia
- Phylum: Arthropoda
- Class: Insecta
- Order: Lepidoptera
- Family: Nymphalidae
- Genus: Scada
- Species: S. zibia

Binomial name
- Scada zibia (Hewitson, 1856)

Synonyms
- Ithomia zibia Hewitson, 1856; Scada amplificata Haensch, 1905; Ithomia (Oleria) xanthina Bates, 1866; Scada theaphia batesi Haensch, 1903; Scada zibia nigrocollaris Bryk, 1953; Scada ethica ab. quotidiana Haensch, 1903; Scada theaphia dubia Bryk, 1953; Scada perpuncta Kaye, 1918

= Scada zibia =

Species of butterfly

Scada zibia, the Zibia clearwing, is a species of butterfly of the family Nymphalidae. It is found in Central and South America.

== Subspecies ==
- Scada zibia zibia; (Colombia)
- Scada zibia batesi Haensch, 1903 (Ecuador, Peru)
- Scada zibia perpuncta Kaye, 1918 (Colombia, Peru)
- Scada zibia quotidiana Haensch, 1909 (Ecuador, Peru)
- Scada zibia xanthina (Bates, 1866) (Nicaragua to Panama)
- Scada zibia zeroca Fox, 1967 (Ecuador)
