= Lorenz (disambiguation) =

Lorenz is a German name.

Lorenz may also refer to:

== Mathematics and science ==
- Lorenz system, a system of equations notable for having chaotic solutions
- Lorenz gauge condition, in electromagnetism
- Lorenz curve, an income distribution curve
- Lorenz cipher, a German cryptography machine

== Other uses ==
- St. Lorenz, Nuremberg, Germany
- St. Lorenz Basilica in Kempten im Allgäu, Germany
- C. Lorenz AG, a German electrical and electronics firm
- Lorenz beam, a radio-navigation system for aircraft developed by C. Lorenz AG
- Lorenz Publishing, American music publisher
- Lorenz rifle, an Austrian rifle designed in 1854
- Lorenz Snack-World, a German food company

== See also ==
- Lorentz (disambiguation)
