= Lorenza Arnetoli =

Italian basketball player (born 1974)

Personal information
- Nationality: Italian
- Born: 30 March 1974 (age 50); Figline Valdarno, Italy

Sport
- Sport: Basketball

Lorenza Arnetoli (born 30 March 1974) is an Italian basketball player. She competed in the women's tournament at the 1996 Summer Olympics.
