= Lorenza Jordan Cole =

American pianist

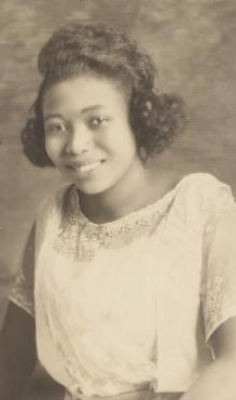
- Lorenza Jordan Cole, from a 1921 publicity photo
- Born: Lorenza Jordan; August 6, 1897; Texas, U.S.
- Died: April 10, 1994 (age 96); Los Angeles, California, U.S.
- Occupation(s): Pianist, music educator
- Relatives: Yvonne Cole Meo (daughter)

Lorenza E. Jordan Cole (August 6, 1897 – April 10, 1994) was an American concert pianist and music educator, based for much of her career in Los Angeles. In 1925, she was described as "the West's great Race pianist." Mary White Ovington supported Cole's education and performing career.

== Early life and education ==
Jordan was born in Texas and raised in California, the daughter of Edward Jordan and Amanda Olive Scott Jordan. She attended Los Angeles High School. She trained as a pianist with Marie Gashweiler in Seattle, and with Marguerite Melville Liszniewska at the Cincinnati Conservatory of Music. In 1930 she graduated from the Institute of Musical Art (Juilliard), with financial support arranged by Mary White Ovington of the NAACP. She also studied in London with Tobias Matthay in 1931. She earned a degree in music education from UCLA in 1942.

== Career ==
Cole played concerts for radio in Ohio. She gave "a recital of musical import" at the Women's Century Club in Seattle in 1928, and at the Civic Club in New York City in 1929. In 1931, she gave a recital in Geneva, Switzerland, featuring works by Nathaniel Dett and Samuel Coleridge- Taylor. She gave a benefit concert in Los Angeles in 1932, accompanied Florence Cole Talbert in 1933, and toured as a concert pianist in 1920s and 1930s.

Cole was head of the piano department at Tuskegee Institute from 1936 to 1939, and a music educator in Los Angeles, She taught music at Belvedere Junior High School for 22 years, and started the school's orchestra. She gave an oral history interview to Bette Yarbrough Cox in the 1980s.

Cole was an active member of Delta Sigma Theta in Los Angeles.

== Personal life ==
In 1917, Jordan married Thomas Augustus Cole and moved to Seattle. They had daughters Sybil (who died from pneumonia in 1922, at age 4) and Yvonne. Her husband died in 1990, and Cole died in 1994, at the age of 96, in Los Angeles.
