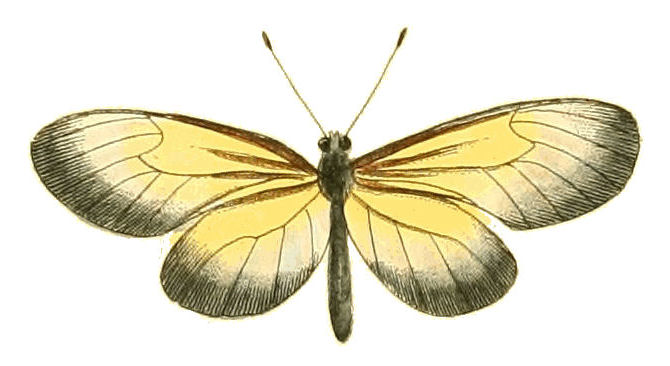
- Illustration by Dru Drury

Scientific classification
- Domain: Eukaryota
- Kingdom: Animalia
- Phylum: Arthropoda
- Class: Insecta
- Order: Lepidoptera
- Family: Nymphalidae
- Genus: Scada
- Species: S. karschina

Binomial name
- Scada karschina (Herbst, 1792)

Synonyms
- Papilio euritaea Drury, 1782 (preocc. Cramer); Papilio karschina Herbst, 1792; Heliconia gazoria Godart, 1819; Salacia phyllodoce Hübner, [1823]; Ithomia yanina Hewitson, 1856

= Scada karschina =

Species of butterfly

Scada karschina is a species of clearwing (ithomiine) butterflies in the family Nymphalidae, native to Brazil.

== Description ==
Upperside. Antennae black. Head black, with small white spots. Neck orange. Thorax black, with grey marks. Abdomen black at top, and grey on the sides. Wings yellowish white, verged and tipped with black, without any marks or spots on them.

Underside. Palpi and breast grey. Legs black. Abdomen white. Anus yellowish. Wings coloured as on the upper side. Wingspan 2 inches (50 mm).

== Subspecies ==
- Scada karschina karschina
- Scada karschina delicata Talbot, 1932
