= Gloria Bohanon =

American visual artist (1938–2008)

Gloria Racine Bohanon
- Born: June 19, 1938; Atlanta, Georgia
- Died: May 7, 2008 (aged 69)
- Education: Wayne State University (BA, MA)
- Occupations: Visual artist and educator

Gloria Racine Bohanon (June 19, 1938 – May 7, 2008) was an American visual artist and educator, based in Los Angeles, California.

== Early life and education ==
Bohanon was born in Atlanta, Georgia on June 19, 1938. She received a BA degree in art education and an MA degree in art education from Wayne State University in Detroit. She also studied at Otis College of Art and Design in 1973.

== Career ==
Bohanon was an active member of the Los Angeles contemporary art scene in the 1970s. As a professor at Los Angeles Community College, she organized "Black Culture Week" in 1974. She taught design, painting, printmaking, and served as chair of the Arts Department while there. She was the director of ADAPT, an organization for disabled students (Accommodated Disabled Arts Program and Training) while at LACC.

Bohanon was one of the earliest members of the Los Angeles County Museum of Art's Black Arts Council. Her work was shown with other influential African American artists who were based in LA, including "The Sapphire Show" in 1970 at Gallery 32 with Betye Saar, Suzanne Jackson, Yvonne Cole Meo, and Senga Nengudi. She was featured with Betye Saar and Suzanne Jackson at Womanspace in 1973 in an exhibition titled "Black Mirror."

She had solo exhibitions at Alonzo and Dale Brockman Davis' Brockman Gallery. She was also included in a 1971 book Black Artists on Art, Volume 2.
