= Suzanne Jackson (artist) =

American visual artist (born 1944)

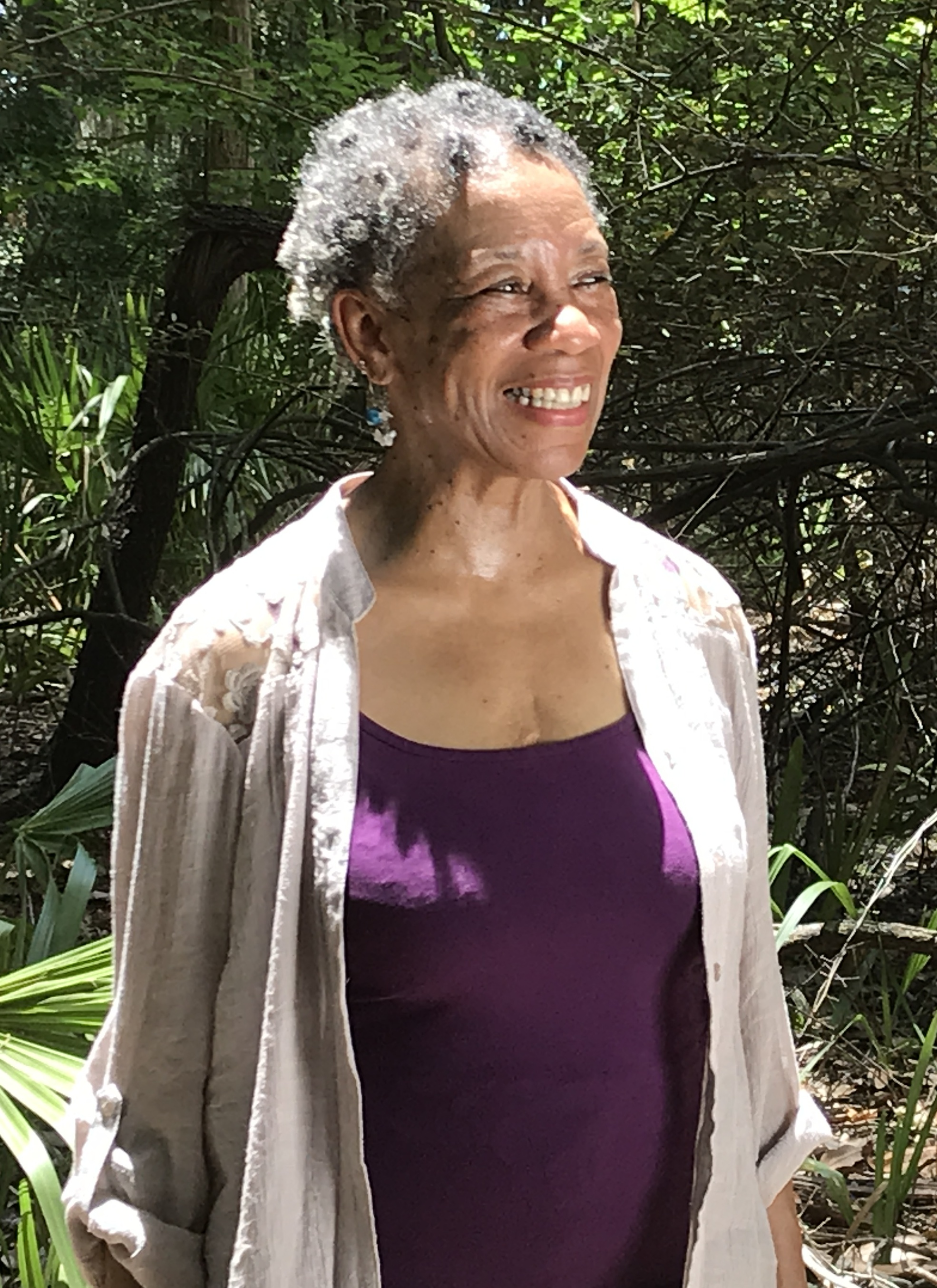
- Jackson at Wormsloe Historic Site, Savannah, Georgia, 2018
- Born: January 30, 1944 (age 82); St. Louis, Missouri, U.S.
- Other names: Suzanne Fitzallen Jackson, Suzanne Jackson Odùsolú
- Education: San Francisco State University (BA), Yale University (MFA)

Suzanne Jackson (born 1944) is an American visual artist, gallery owner, poet, educator, and set designer; with a career spanning five decades. Her work has been exhibited in museums and galleries around the world. Since the late 1960s, Jackson has dedicated her life to studio art with additional participation in theatre, teaching, arts administration, community life, and social activism. Jackson's oeuvre includes poetry, dance, theater, costume design, paintings (both two- and three-dimensional), prints, and drawings.

Jackson has spent time throughout her career teaching students and influencing future generations of artists and culture creators, as well as building and participating in close-knit art communities with peer artists and thinkers. She worked in Los Angeles during the 1960s to 1980s, founding Gallery 32, and exhibiting additional work at the Ankrum Gallery. During the 1980s she lived in Idyllwild, California teaching and creating art. She also worked at Yale University, and in New York and Philadelphia in the 1990s. She worked in the Savannah, Georgia art community, from 1996 to 2009.

== Early life and education ==
Jackson was born in 1944 in Saint Louis, Missouri. Her family moved to San Francisco, California, when she was nine months old. Jackson lived in San Francisco until she was eight years old, after which she was raised in the city of Fairbanks, Alaska, from 1952 to 1961. She graduated from Monroe Catholic High School in 1961. As a teenager in Alaska, she became a member of the National Audubon Society which influenced some of the content of her work from a young age. She was also the first African American to attend the National 4-H Congress in Chicago in 1960, which helped her receive scholarships and allowed her to attend college.

Jackson attended San Francisco State University (SFSU), where she studied both art and ballet, eventually receiving a BA degree in painting. She worked at San Francisco State University alongside San Francisco Bay Area artists and teachers, including Charles White. While at SFSU, Jackson installed exhibitions at the campus art gallery and taught art at St. Stephen's Catholic School.

She later completed an MFA degree in 1990 from the School of Drama, Yale University, specializing in theater design.

== Career ==
=== 1960s–1970s ===
After college Jackson toured South America with a ballet company and later returned to California to settle in Echo Park. Upon returning to California, Jackson took a drawing class at Otis Art Institute with Charles White, where she began to connect with other California artists such as Dan Concholar, Alonzo Davis, and Timothy Washington. In 1968, she opened Gallery 32, which operated for two years and which Jackson funded herself. Jackson held several solo exhibitions during the 1970s at Ankrum Gallery, which was run by actress-turned-gallerist Joan Wheeler Ankrum and actor William Challee. Jackson produced artists books of poetry and painting, "What I Love" (1972) and "Animals" (1978). (see Poetry)

“When Bernie [Casey] brought to the gallery several of Suzanne’s paintings, I was immediately struck with the freshness and originality of her work. It is most unusual to find so young an artist with a valid philosophical statement (and to communicate it successfully). Her feelings about her blackness are expressed in somewhat symbolic terms, and her world of fantasy, love and hope is revealed to the viewer in a very refreshing style… She very well may be the first Black woman in America to make a truly important contribution to art.” -- Joan Ankrum (1/5/1974)

=== 1980s–1990s ===
In 1981, Jackson was first introduced to Savannah, Georgia, through an invitation to be a visiting artist with Savannah College of Art and Design through the recommendation of Bernie Casey. Additionally, in 1981, Jackson's work was included in the exhibition “Forever Free: African American Women” which traveled to the Gibbes Museum of Art in Charleston, South Carolina. Jackson lived in Idyllwild, California, from 1981 to 1985 and was on faculty as a Visiting Artist at the Idyllwild School of Music and Arts (1981–1982), and chair of the Fine and Performing Arts at the Elliott-Pope Preparatory School (formerly Desert Sun School) (1982–1985).

In 1987, Jackson relocated to New Haven, Connecticut, to attend Yale University, pursuing a master's degree under the tutelage of Ming Cho Lee for scenography. She worked as a freelance scenic and costume designer moving throughout the region; until taking a post at St. Mary's College of Maryland as a scenographer and assistant professor from 1994 to 1996. In 1996, Jackson moved full-time to Savannah, Georgia, to teach at Savannah College of Art and Design as professor of painting, where she taught full-time until 2009.

Jackson was a member of the inaugural group of the Cave Canem poets, which “was founded by Toi Derricotte and Cornelius Eady in 1996 to remedy the underrepresentation and isolation of African-American poets in the literary landscape.” She was mentored by Lucille Clifton (1936–2010), Poet Laureate of Maryland, and was a member of the International Women’s Writing Guild. She has published two books of poetry, Animal and What I love.

=== 2000s–present ===
Jackson officially retired from SCAD in 2009, but Jackson remained as a part-time and adjunct professor until 2013. Additionally, Jackson taught introductory art history courses, including African American Art History at Savannah State University in 2013–2014 school year. Jackson has remained an active member of the Savannah artistic community and continues to create and exhibit her work. Jackson co-hosts a weekly radio show featuring jazz and conversation, called Listen Hear on WHCJ 90.3 Savannah State University Radio, alongside Ike Carter, Jerome Meadows, Tom Van de Ven, Lisa Jackson and Carla Curran, PhD. In 2019 Jackson was the recipient of a Joan Mitchell Painters & Sculptors Grant. Her work was included in the 2024 exhibition Making Their Mark: Works from the Shah Garg Collection at the Berkeley Art Museum and Pacific Film Archive (BAMPFA).

In 2026, the San Francisco Museum of Modern Art presented Suzanne Jackson: What Is Love, the first major museum retrospective dedicated to Suzanne Jackson. The exhibition brought together more than 80 works.

== Artistic practice ==
Suzanne Jackson has had an extensive career and has emphasized the importance of living the lifestyle of an artist, in her words: to be an artist is to solve problems as opposed to create images. She states, “I'm not an artist yet. I'm a painter. And I draw, and I work in theater as an artist person, but to become an artist takes a whole lifetime.” Throughout her career, Jackson has looked to nature for inspiration; she has consistently related blackness to nature. Her work has celebrated blackness through the representation of black bodies without an overtly political message.

=== Visual arts ===
Jackson has worked in a variety of visual media including works on paper, works on canvas, and Monoprints. Her works on paper include both watercolors and drawings from throughout her career. Jackson has worked mostly with acrylic paint, her earliest paintings on canvas were with acrylic paint layered, the way one would layer oils paints. She stated, “the imagery that everybody has sort of become familiar with, with the really strong white background and the sort of washy layers and layers of paint—that basically is kind of an old masters technique of layering the color for translucency. It's like the layers and layers of color build a depth in the painting. And some of the paintings, as thin as the color looks, there could be a hundred and fifty layers of color on each of my paintings.” The 1990s marked a shift in her work as she began to experiment with different combinations of media. As her style progressed, Jackson began to forego the canvas in favor of netting as a substrate. She uses Novacolor brand acrylic gels to create 3-dimensional hanging works held together by fabric, papers, found objects, leaves, and or various netting.

Her visual art work is included in public museum collections including at the Museum of Modern Art, California African American Museum, the Indianapolis Museum of Art, and the Hammer Museum at UCLA.

== Gallery 32 ==
Many associate Jackson's name with Gallery 32, an art gallery she ran in MacArthur Park, Los Angeles from 1968 to 1970, dedicated to fostering a supportive artist community. Gallery 32 was inspired by artist Charles White's philosophy that art could be an effective vehicle for community activism and social change. Seeking to replicate Jackson's previous experiences of San Francisco bohemianism, Gallery 32 functioned less as a business than as a place for the exchange of ideas and philosophies. Jackson funded the gallery herself, largely with money she earned from teaching. The gallery became an important venue, hosting discussions, poetry readings, and fund-raisers for social causes, and exhibiting work that demonstrated strong political and civic engagement. She aimed to make art from black artists with black themes accessible for all members of the community. It quickly became one of the few art spaces in Los Angeles to exhibit emerging African American artists such as Gloria Bohanon, Emory Douglas, David Hammons, Betye Saar, and Timothy Washington. Among the organizations for which the gallery hosted fundraisers were the Black Arts Council, the Black Panther Party, and the Watts Towers Arts Center children's arts program. One of the gallery's important exhibitions was the 1970 Sapphire Show, the first Los Angeles survey of African American women artists. Gallery 32 played a vital role in the progressive struggles of the period while contributing to the diverse art scene of Los Angeles. The remaining artworks and ephemera have been promised to the Getty Research Institute per the artist's request.
