= Lorentz curve =

Lorentz curve may refer to

- the Cauchy–Lorentz distribution, a probability distribution
- the Lorenz curve, a graphical representation of the inequality in a quantity's distribution
