= Betye Saar =

American artist (1926–2026)

- Born: Betye Irene Brown; July 30, 1926; Los Angeles, California, U.S.
- Died: July 26, 2026 (aged 99); Los Angeles, California, U.S.
- Education: UCLA; Pasadena City College; California State University, Long Beach
- Known for: Assemblage
- Movement: Black Arts Movement
- Children: 3; including Alison and Lezley

Betye Irene Saar (née Brown; July 30, 1926 – July 26, 2026) was an American artist known for her work in the medium of assemblage. She was a visual storyteller and an accomplished printmaker. Saar was a part of the Black Arts Movement in the 1970s, which engaged myths and stereotypes about race and femininity. Her work is considered highly political, as she challenged negative ideas about African Americans throughout her career; Saar is best known for her artwork that critiques anti-Black racism in the United States.

== Early life and education ==
Betye Saar was born Betye Irene Brown on July 30, 1926, to Jefferson Maze Brown and Beatrice Lillian Parson in Los Angeles, California. Both parents attended the University of California, Los Angeles, where they met. Saar spent her early years in Los Angeles. After her father's death in 1931, Saar and her mother, brother, and sister moved in with her paternal grandmother, Irene Hannah Maze, in the Watts neighborhood in Los Angeles. The family then moved to Pasadena, California, to live with Saar's maternal great-aunt Hatte Parson Keys and her husband Robert E. Keys.

Growing up, Saar collected various ephemera and regularly created and repaired objects. Her college education began with art classes at Pasadena City College and continued at the University of California, Los Angeles, after she received a tuition award from an organization that raised funds to send minority students to universities. Saar earned a B.A. in design in 1947. She went on to graduate studies at California State University, Long Beach, University of Southern California, California State University, Northridge, and the American Film Institute. During her time in graduate school, she married Richard Saar and gave birth to three daughters: Tracye, Alison, and Lezley.

== Artistic career ==
=== Early work ===
Saar started her adult life as a social worker, and then later pursued her passion for art. She began her graduate education in 1958, originally working towards a career in teaching design. However, a printmaking class she took as an elective changed the direction of her artistic interests. She described printmaking as her "segue from design into fine arts".

In Saar's early work she collected racist imagery and continued throughout her career. She was inspired to create assemblages by a 1967 exhibition by found object sculptor, Joseph Cornell. She was also greatly influenced by Simon Rodia's Watts Towers, which she witnessed being built in her childhood. Saar said that she was "fascinated by the materials that Simon Rodia used, the broken dishes, sea shells, rusty tools, even corn cobs—all pressed into cement to create spires. To me, they were magical."

In oral history interviews, Saar later recalled seeing extensive African, Oceanic, and Egyptian art on a visit to the Field Museum in Chicago as being "an important step in my development as an artist ... They had rooms and rooms of it. I had never seen that much." She found the robe of an African chief especially meaningful.

She began to create work that consisted of found objects arranged within boxes or windows, with items that drew from various cultures to reflect her own mixed ancestry: African American, Irish, and Native American.

=== Rejection of white feminism and reclaiming the black female body ===
Saar was raised by her Aunt Hattie, who influenced her identity as a Black woman. Saar described her great-aunt as a woman with dignity and poise, which impacted her depiction of the Black female body. This impact is evident in a work Saar dedicated to her great-aunt titled Record For Hattie, 1972. Saar's rejection of white feminism initially pushed her artistic focus on the Black male but in the 1970s she shifted her focus to the Black female body. Record For Hattie is a mixed media assemblage made from an antique jewelry box. Inside the top of the jewelry box is a broken picture frame containing a faded picture of a woman, representing her Aunt Hattie. Surrounding the picture frame rose materials are sewn along with a red and white star and crescent moon pendent. In the bottom of the jewelry box there is a metal cross on the right side, a red leather wallet in the middle, on top is an image of child, and on the left there are sewing materials.

During the 1970s Saar responded to the racism, fetishization, and eroticization of the Black female body by reclaiming it. Saar's work resisted the artistic style of primitivism, as well as the white feminist movement that refused to address issues of race. Saar's work is a result of the convergence of Black power, spirituality and mysticism, astrology, and feminism, as seen in Black Girl's Window, 1969. Black Girl's Window is an assemblage piece made from an old window, in which the painted silhouette of a girl presses her face and hands against the pane. Above her head are nine smaller window panes arranged three by three, which display various symbols and images, including moons and stars, a howling wolf, a sketched skeleton, an eagle with the word "love" across its chest, and a tintype woman.

In the 1960s, Saar began collecting images of Aunt Jemima, Uncle Tom, Little Black Sambo, and other stereotyped African American figures from folk culture and advertising of the Jim Crow era. She incorporated them into collages and assemblages, transforming them into statements of political and social protest. The Liberation of Aunt Jemima is one of her most notable works from this era. In this mixed-media assemblage, Saar utilized the stereotypical mammy figure of Aunt Jemima to subvert traditional notions of race and gender. "It's like they abolished slavery but they kept Black people in the kitchen as Mammy jars," Saar said of what drove her to make the piece. "I had this Aunt Jemima, and I wanted to put a rifle and a grenade under her skirts. I wanted to empower her. I wanted to make her a warrior. I wanted people to know that Black people wouldn't be enslaved by that."

Saar's famed Aunt Jemina assemblage is laid inside of a shoebox-sized frame, plastered with Aunt Jemima advertisements. A caricatured sculpture of Aunt Jemima presents a notepad with a photograph of a Mammy with a white baby depicted. The Aunt Jemima sculpture holds a broom and a rifle, subverting her happy servant and caregiver stereotype by way of a militant alter ego who demands her own agency and power. A large, clenched fist, echoing the Black power symbol, is collaged over and partially obscuring the Mammy photograph, recognizing the aggressive and radical means used by African American activists in the 1970s to fight for their rights. Aunt Jemima is liberated through transformation from a racist domestic caricature into an image of Black power.

Although Saar considered herself to be a feminist, she avoided referring to her artwork as such. Instead, Saar preferred to emphasize the elements of cross-culturalism and spirituality that are present in her pieces. During the early 1970s, Saar endured racism within the context of the white feminist arts movement. These experiences caused her to become interested in promoting a Black consciousness that was distinct from the Black power politics of the era. Saar's autobiographical representations of Black womanhood are not erotic and do not explicitly represent the body; therefore, they exemplify a resistance to imaging the Black body. This resistance suggests her rejection of white feminism and her rejection of the "feminine aesthetic" that is determined by white feminists and grounded in female sexuality.

She was supported as an artist-in-residence in Adelaide, South Australia, by the Women's Art Movement there in the 1970s or 1980s.

=== Assemblage and installation ===
Saar's lifelong habit of scouring flea markets and yard sales deepened her exposure to the many racial stereotypes and demeaning depictions of Blacks to be found among the artifacts of American commercial and consumer culture, such as advertisements, marketing materials, knick-knacks, sheet music, and toys. Three years later, she produced a series of more than twenty pieces that, in her own words, "exploded the myth" of such imagery, beginning with her seminal portrait of Aunt Jemima. In the 1970s, Saar moved on to explore ritual and tribal objects from Africa as well as items from African American folk traditions. In boxed assemblages, she combined shamanistic tribal fetishes with images and objects intended to evoke the magical and the mystical. When her great-aunt died in 1974, Saar acquired family memorabilia and created a series of more personal and intimate assemblages that incorporated nostalgic mementos of her great-aunt's life. She arranged old photographs, letters, lockets, dried flowers, and handkerchiefs in shrine-like boxes to suggest memory, loss, and the passage of time. This became a body of work she referred to as her "nostalgic series".

In 1977, Saar created a piece entitled Spirit Catcher. It was inspired by and looks like a traditional craft item used in rituals, but was personally invented by her. She claimed that although the object is not authentically sourced, it still has magical qualities. There is a mirror on the top of the artwork that could be interpreted as an evil eye against racism. Saar occasionally utilized organic materials in her work, such as bamboo, skulls, raffia, and rattan, and a few of these materials can be seen in Spirit Catcher. This assemblage piece caused many Los Angeles-based artists of color to see the straw and beads as a way to explore an organic and even mysterious sense of Blackness. Saar and this particular piece were also the subjects of a short television documentary entitled Spirit Catcher—The Art of Betye Saar, which aired on television in 1978. Betye Saar became an influential figure in African American and feminist art through her use of assemblage to address race, gender, spirituality, and cultural identity. By incorporating found objects and historical imagery into her artwork, Saar challenged conventional representations of African Americans and explored the relationship between personal memory and collective history. Her work contributed to broader discussions about the representation of Black women in American art.

In the early 1980s, Saar taught in Los Angeles at UCLA and the Otis Art Institute. In her own work she approached a larger, room-sized scale, and created site-specific installations. These included altar-like shrines exploring the relationship between technology and spirituality, and incorporated her interests in mysticism and Voodoo. Through the pairing of computer chips with mystical amulets and charms, these monumental constructions suggested the need for an alliance of both systems of knowledge: the technical and the spiritual.

She continued to live and work in Los Angeles, working primarily in found object sculpture. She was awarded honorary doctorate degrees by California College of Arts and Crafts, California Institute of the Arts, Massachusetts College of Art, Otis College of Art and Design, and San Francisco Art Institute.

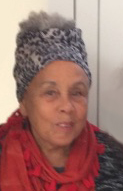
Saar in 2016

In 2016, she celebrated her work with a couple of parties and a solo show of new work at Roberts and Tilton Gallery (now Roberts Projects).

In 2019, Saar mounted concurrent solo shows at the Los Angeles County Museum of Art and the Museum of Modern Art.

In 2021, Saar was inducted into the American Academy of Arts and Letters.

Saar's work was included in the 2025 exhibition Photography and the Black Arts Movement, 1955–1985 at the National Gallery of Art.

==== The Liberation of Aunt Jemima ====
The Liberation of Aunt Jemima (1972) at the Smithsonian American Art Museum

Saar's 1972 artwork The Liberation of Aunt Jemima was inspired by a knick knack she found of Aunt Jemima although it seems like a painting, it is a three dimensional mixed media assemblage 11 3/4" x 8" x 3/4". The journal Blacks in Higher Education states that "her painting offered a detailed history of the Black experience in America". Saar shows Aunt Jemima exaggerated in every way by stereotypes. She wears a large exaggerated colored dress with a bright, checkered headpiece. Her skin is depicted as really Black; her eyes are large bulging out of her head. Her lips are large and highlighted with red color. She draws out the stereotype of being Black. The figure holds a broom in one hand, showing they were only good for cleaning, and stands on cotton representing slavery. The Woman's Art Journal states: "African American artists as diverse as Betye Saar reclaim and explore their identity. 'Not good enough' and 'But good enough to serve.'" While the piece shows the Aunt Jemima holding a cleaning tool in her right hand, it also shows her holding a rifle in her left. This allowed Saar to establish a visual connection between Aunt Jemima and the concept of resistance. By doing so, Aunt Jemima is depicted as being a powerful figure who commands the attention and respect of the viewers. Angela Davis has said the work launched the Black women's movement.

In her 2016 article "Influences" for Frieze magazine, Saar explained directly about some of her artistic choices in the piece: "I found a little Aunt Jemima mammy figure, a caricature of a Black slave, like those later used to advertise pancakes. She had a broom in one hand, and, on the other side, I gave her a rifle. In front of her, I placed a little postcard, of a mammy with a mulatto child, which is another way Black women were exploited during slavery. I used the derogatory image to empower the Black woman by making her a revolutionary, like she was rebelling against her past enslavement."

In the book Parodies [sic] of Ownership, Richard Schur states, "Saar deployed Aunt Jemima's image to promote cultural nationalism during the 1960s and 1970s[…] [she] sought to correct the injustice done by over one hundred years of stereotyped advertising and depicts Aunt Jemima in an angry, defiant, and/ or rebellious poses." In the work, which was originally inspired by the assassination of Dr. Martin Luther King Jr., she wanted to promote support for political independence and break stereotypes used to describe Black women.

In "The Women's Art Journal Betye Saar: Extending the Frozen Monument", James Cristen Steward states: "Against the backdrop of pancake packaging is a grinning pop-eyed 'Mammy' with a broom in one hand and a rifle in the other. In the foreground, another vintage caricature of a jaunty, almost flirtatious Mammy, one arm balancing a willing white child against her corset hourglass waist [sic] she simply allows the derogatory images to speak for themselves". The broom symbolizes the domesticity forced upon Black women to occupy jobs in serving, confining them to specific places. White people's perspective on Black women was that they were only good for serving others. She portrays through her art the two representations of Black women and how stereotypes portray them by defeminizing and desexualizing them and reality. Saar's intention for having the stereotype of the mammy holding a rifle was to symbolize that Black women are strong and can endure anything, to represent a warrior. Saar stated that "the reasoning behind this decision is to empower Black women and not let the narrative of a white person determine how a Black women should view herself".

== Film ==
In 1971, Saar created a film entitled Colored Spade. Following the assassination of Dr. Martin Luther King Jr. in 1968, Saar began to work with the racist images of Black individuals that had become so popular in American culture. Saar decided to compile such images into a film based on the song "Colored Spade" from the musical Hair, which contains a list of derogatory terms for African Americans. The film depicts a montage of caricatured images from late-nineteenth and early-twentieth century U.S. culture, such as sheet music, comics, and food containers. Many of these images are animated by camera movements, zooms, and rapid cutting. Eventually, the images of Black individuals are replaced by images of racist organizations, which all culminate into a photograph of a white policeman. Saar zooms in on this image until the focus is lost, and then zooms out to reveal prominent figures from the Civil Rights movement, such as Dr. King and Angela Davis. This recontextualization of racist culture allows the issue to serve as evidence of white prejudice as opposed to Black degeneracy.

== Political activism ==
In the late 1960s, Saar's focus turned to the civil rights movement and issues of race. Black women artists such as Saar, Faith Ringgold, Adrian Piper, Howardena Pindell, and Barbara Chase-Riboud explored African American identities and actively rejected art world racism, while simultaneously being drawn to the cause of women's liberation.

Saar, in her artistic journey through various artistic and activist communities from Black nationalist to Black feminist and womanist, maintained a "mobile of identity" that permitted her to interact freely with each group. Saar met with other Black women artists at Suzanne Jackson's Gallery 32 in 1970. The resulting group show was titled Sapphire (You've Come a Long Way, Baby). This was likely the first contemporary African American women's exhibition in California, and included watercolorist Sue Irons, printmaker Yvonne Cole Meo, painter Suzanne Jackson, pop artist Eileen Abdulrashid, Gloria Bohanon, and Saar.

When asked about the politics behind her art in a 2015 interview with writer Shelley Leopold, Saar stated, "I don't know how politics can be avoided. If you happen to be a young Black male, your parents are terrified that you're going to be arrested—if they hang out with a friend, are they going to be considered a gang? That kind of fear is one you have to pay attention to. It's not comfortable living in the United States. I'm born in Los Angeles, with middle class parents and so I never really had to be in a situation that tense. My grandmother lived in Watts and it's still really poor down there. People just do the best they can."

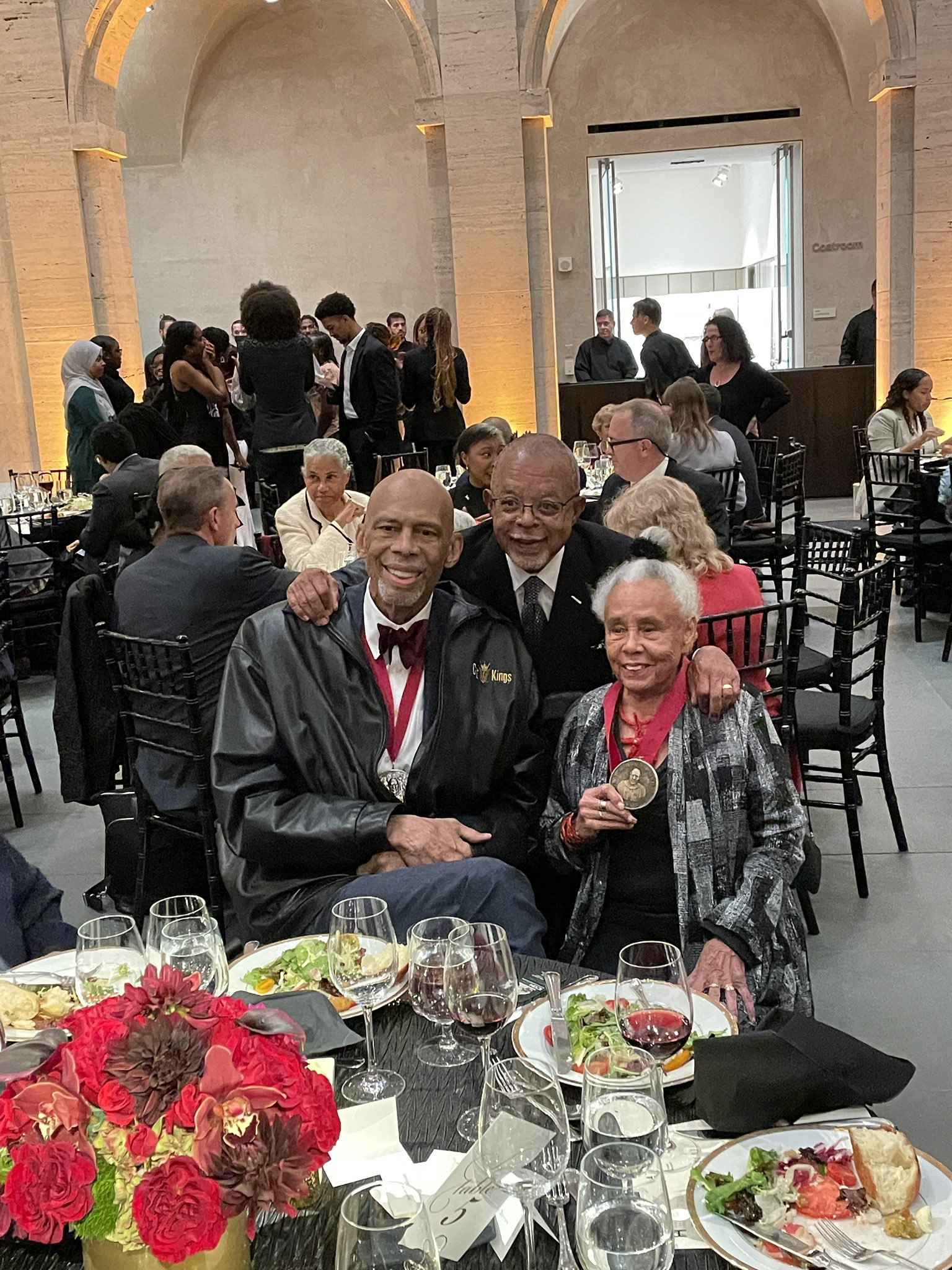
Betye Saar with fellow UCLA Bruin Kareem Abdul-Jabbar receiving The W.E.B. Du Bois Medal from Henry Louis Gates at Harvard on October 6, 2022.

=== Letter campaign ===
In the late 1990s, Saar was a recognizable and vocal critic of artist Kara Walker's work. Walker created artworks that some scholars said exhibited "the psychological dimension of stereotypes and the obscenity of the American racial unconscious". Walker's controversial works included Gone, An Historical Romance of a Civil War as it Occurred Between the Dusky Thighs of One Young Negress and Her Heart (1994) and The End of Uncle Tom and Grand Allegorical Tableau of Eva in Heaven (1995). The shocking images, her supporters said, challenged racist and stereotypical images of African Americans by offering stark images of the degradation of African Americans.

Other critics, such as Saar and Howardena Pindell, disagreed with Walker's approach and believed the artist was reinforcing racism and racist stereotypes of African American life. In an National Public Radio (NPR) interview, Saar stated, "... the work of Kara Walker was sort of revolting and negative and a form of betrayal to the slaves, particularly women and children, and that it was basically for the amusement and the investment of the white art establishment". The difference in age between Saar and her contemporaries and Walker can explain the older critics' reactions to Walker's work. When Walker received the John D. and Catherine T. MacArthur Foundation Genius Award in 1997, Saar wrote letters to people in the art industry, protesting the award and asking, "Are African Americans being betrayed under the guise of art?"

== Betye Saar Legacy Group ==
On July 29, 2025, Saar announced the Betye Saar Legacy Group to safeguard her legacy. The initiative was launched in partnership with her longtime gallery, Roberts Project. The nine curators, all of whom have worked closely with Saar, are:

- Esther Adler (curator of drawings and prints at Museum of Modern Art),
- Christophe Cherix (director of the Museum of Modern Art),
- Carol S. Eliel (senior curator emerita at LACMA),
- Carlo Barbatti (curator at Fondazione Prada in Milan),
- Diana Seave Greenwald (collector curator at Isabella Stewart Gardner Museum),
- Elvira Dyangani Ose (Museu d'Art Contemporani de Barcelona),
- Stephanie Seidel (ICA Miami), and
- Zoé Whitley and Mark Godfrey (co-curators of "Soul of a Nation: Art in the Age of Black Power").

The Group will work with Saar's daughters and will provide support to scholarship and access to Saar's archive.

== Death ==
Betye Saar died at her home in Los Angeles on July 26, 2026, four days before her 100th birthday.

== Notable works in public collections ==
- Aries Nymph (1966), University Museum of Contemporary Art, Amherst, Massachusetts
- A Siege of Sirens (1966), Museum of Fine Arts, Boston and Museum of Modern Art, New York
- Vision of El Cremo (1967), Palmer Museum of Art, State College, Pennsylvania
- Black Girl's Window (1969), Museum of Modern Art, New York
- Gris-Gris Box (1972), Museum of Contemporary Art, Los Angeles
- The Liberation of Aunt Jemima (1972), Berkeley Art Museum and Pacific Film Archive, California
- It's Only A Matter of Time (1974), Hirshhorn Museum and Sculpture Garden, Smithsonian Institution, Washington, DC
- The Time Inbetween (1974), San Francisco Museum of Modern Art
- Indigo Mercy (1975), Studio Museum in Harlem, New York
- The Birds and The Beasts Were There (1976), Hirshhorn Museum and Sculpture Garden, Smithsonian Institution, Washington, DC
- Dark Erotic Dream (1976), Hirshhorn Museum and Sculpture Garden, Smithsonian Institution, Washington, DC
- Keep for Old Memoirs (1976), Museum of Modern Art, New York
- Samadhi (1977), High Museum of Art, Atlanta
- Twilight Awakening (1978), National Gallery of Art, Washington, DC
- Window of Ancient Sirens (1979), Studio Museum in Harlem, New York
- Dat Ol' Black Magic (1981), National Gallery of Art, Washington, DC
- Ball of Fire (1985), Philadelphia Museum of Art
- Cryptic Confessions, The Question (1988), Boca Raton Museum of Art, Florida
- The Differences Between (1989), Museum of Fine Arts, Boston
- House of Ancient Memory (1989), Walker Art Center, Minneapolis
- La Luz (1989), Munson-Williams-Proctor Arts Institute, Utica, New York
- Wishing for Winter (1989), Smithsonian Museum of American Art, Smithsonian Institution, Washington, DC
- Ancestral Spirit Chair (1992), Smith College Museum of Art, Northampton, Massachusetts
- Gris Gris Guardian (1990–1993), Los Angeles County Museum of Art
- The Trickster (1994), National Gallery of Art, Washington, DC
- Whitey's Way (1970–1996), Metropolitan Museum of Art, New York
- Blow Top Blues: The Fire Next Time (1998), Minneapolis Institute of Art and National Gallery of Art, Washington, DC
- I'll Bend But I Will Not Break (1998), Los Angeles County Museum of Art
- The Long Memory (1998), Pennsylvania Academy of the Fine Arts, Philadelphia and Smith College Museum of Art, Northampton, Massachusetts
- Maid-Rite (Mask Eyes) (1998), Pennsylvania Academy of the Fine Arts, Philadelphia
- Mother and Children in Blue (1998), Whitney Museum of American Art, New York
- Wot's Dat (1998) from the series Workers + Warriors: The Return of Aunt Jemima, Herbert F. Johnson Museum of Art, Ithaca, New York
