= William Challee =

American actor (1904–1989)

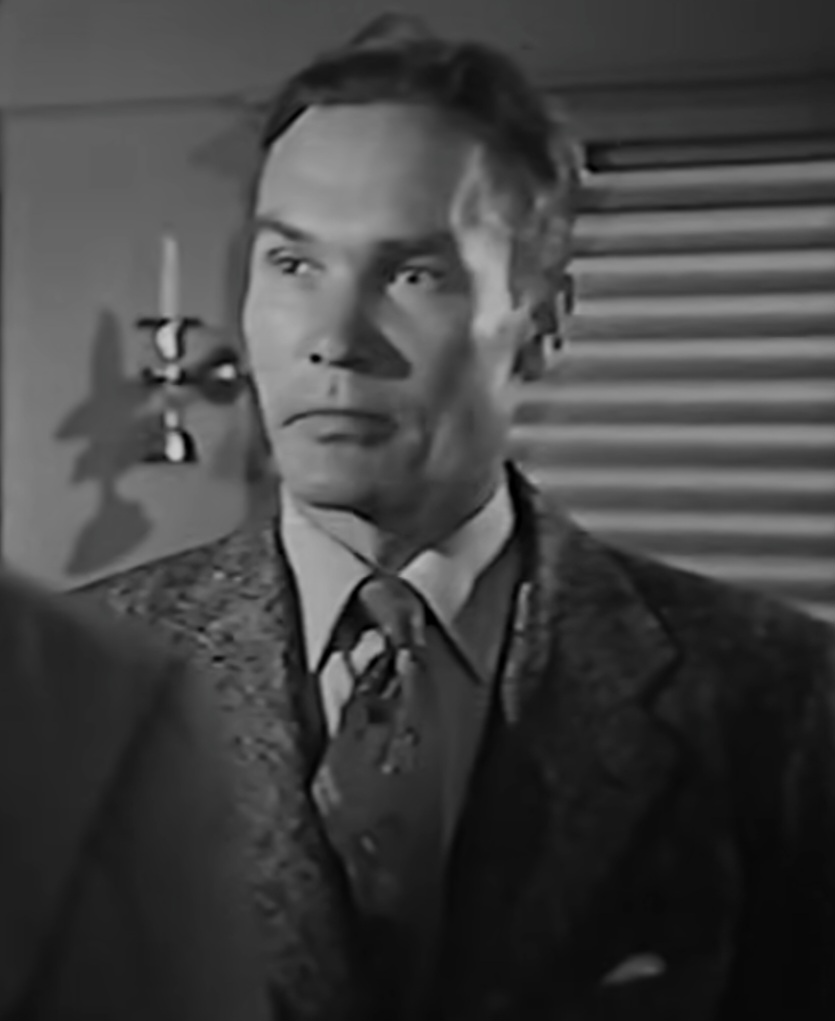
- Challee in Port of New York (1949)
- Born: William John Challe; April 6, 1904; Chicago, Illinois, U.S.
- Died: March 11, 1989 (aged 84); Woodland Hills, Los Angeles, California, U.S.
- Resting place: Alta Mesa Memorial Park, Palo Alto, California
- Occupation: Actor
- Years active: 1926–1979
- Spouses: Ruth Nelson (m. 1931; div. 1937) Ella Franklin Crawford (m. 1944, divorced) Joan Wheeler Ankrum (m. 1984)

William John Challee (April 6, 1904 – March 11, 1989) was an American actor.

== Biography ==
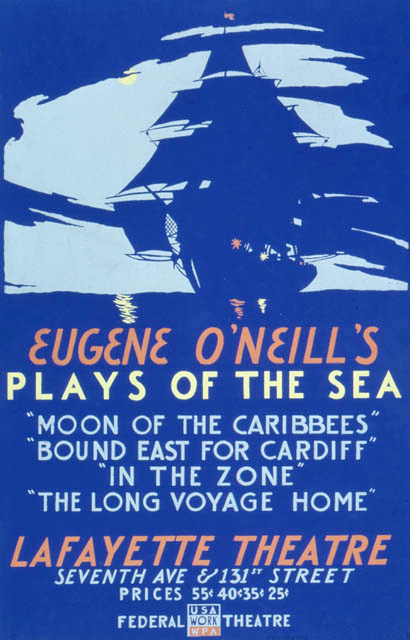
Challee directed Eugene O'Neill's S.S. Glencairn cycle for the Federal Theatre Project in 1937.

Challee was born in Chicago and was a student at Lake View High School.

Challee appeared on Broadway by 1926 and by 1931 in early Group Theatre productions. He married actress Ruth Nelson on August 2, 1931; they divorced on August 13, 1937. The two appeared in the 1947 film The Sea of Grass, in supporting roles, after they were divorced.

In 1937, Challee staged a suite of one-act plays at the Lafayette Theatre in Harlem, under the heading Plays of the Sea. The suite consisted of the Eugene O'Neill plays Bound East for Cardiff, In the Zone, The Long Voyage Home, and Moon of the Caribbees. They were produced by the Federal Theatre Project of the Works Progress Administration, running for 68 performances from October 29, 1937.

Challee was living in Chicago by 1940. By the middle 1940s, Challee was working in films in California, mainly in supporting and uncredited roles. Challee married dancer Ella Franklin Crawford on April 19, 1944, in Santa Monica.

Challee appeared in episodes of numerous television series, including a 1953 episode ("Stage for Mademoiselle") of The Lone Ranger and a 1957 episode ("The Case of the Runaway Corpse") of Perry Mason. In 1960, Challee appeared as Saunders on Laramie in the episode titled "Duel at Parkinson Town". In 1961, he appeared as Eli in the series finale of The Investigators, "The Dead End Man", as well as the 1961 episode "Meeting at the Mimbres" in the Western series Bat Masterson.

In 1962, Challee appeared (uncredited) as a prisoner on the TV Western The Virginian in the episode titled "The Brazen Bell". That same year, he appeared on Gunsmoke as Feist, a crazed pioneer who lost his faculties and tries to kill Marshal Dillon in the episode “The Gallows”. Challee played the incapacitated family patriarch in the 1970 film Five Easy Pieces, whose illness brings his son (Jack Nicholson) home to the family estate.

In 1984, he married his long-time partner Joan Wheeler Ankrum. Together, in 1960, they opened the Ankrum Gallery on La Cienega Boulevard in Los Angeles.

Challee was buried in Alta Mesa Memorial Park in Palo Alto.

== Broadway roles ==
- Grand Street Follies [1927] (1927) (revue)
- Red Rust (1929) as Lenov
- House of Connelly (1931) as Jody and as a Serenader
- Night Over Taos (1932) as second Trapper
- Success Story (1932) as Jeffery Haliburton
- Men in White (1933) as Dr. Michaelson
- Gold Eagle Guy (1934) as Pearly and as Ah Kee
- Till the Day I Die (1935) as Edsel Peltz
- Waiting For Lefty (1935) as Actor
- Key Largo (1935) as Osceola Horn
- Paradise Lost (1935) as Homeless man
- Case of Clyde Griffiths (1936) as Working man
- Johnny Johnson (1936) as Private Fairfax and as Doctor
- Rocket to the Moon (1938) as a Salesman
- Awake and Sing! (1939) as Schlosser

== Selected filmography ==
- ...One Third of a Nation... (1939) as Reporter (uncredited)
- Destination Tokyo (1943) as Rocky the quartermaster (uncredited)
- The Story of Dr. Wassell (1944) as Radio Man (uncredited)
- Days of Glory (1944) as Ducrenko (uncredited)
- The Seventh Cross (1944) as Fischer (uncredited)
- None but the Lonely Heart (1944) as Knocker Jones (uncredited)
- A Song to Remember (1945) as Titus (uncredited)
- God Is My Co-Pilot (1945) as Joe (uncredited)
- Counter-Attack (1945) as Paratrooper (uncredited)
- Miss Susie Slagle's (1946) as Interne (uncredited)
- Tokyo Rose (1946) as Mike Kovac
- Deadline at Dawn (1946) as Ray, Newsstand Proprietor (uncredited)
- From This Day Forward (1946) as Pawnbroker (uncredited)
- Without Reservations (1946) as Corporal (uncredited)
- Swamp Fire (1946) as Barfly (uncredited)
- Nocturne (1946) as Police Photographer Olsen (uncredited)
- Boomerang (1947) as Whitney, Harvey's Assistant (uncredited)
- The Sea of Grass (1947) as Deputy Sheriff (uncredited)
- The Guilt of Janet Ames (1947) as Ambulance Surgeon (uncredited)
- Desperate (1947) as Reynolds
- Another Part of the Forest (1948) as Passenger on the Train (uncredited)
- Tap Roots (1948) as Sergeant (uncredited)
- Beyond Glory (1948) as Sergeant at Depot (uncredited)
- Force of Evil (1948) as Gunman #1 (uncredited)
- Reign of Terror (1949) as Bourdon (uncredited)
- Port of New York (1949) as Leo Stasser
- Outrage (1950) as Lee Wilkins
- The Lone Ranger (1950) (TV Series) (Season 1 Episode 25: "Buried Treasure") as Flint Foster
- Gambling (1950) as Parking Attendant (uncredited)
- The Whip Hand (1951) as Guard (uncredited)
- On Dangerous Ground (1951) as Thug (uncredited)
- The Big Trees (1952) as Brother Williams (uncredited)
- This Woman Is Dangerous (1952) as Ned Shaw (uncredited)
- The Glenn Miller Story (1954) as Dispatch Desk Sergeant (uncredited)
- Man Without a Star (1955) as Brick Gooder (uncredited)
- The Lone Ranger (1955, TV Series) as Bad-Eye
- The Lone Ranger (1955, TV Series, episode “Wanted: The Lone Ranger”) as Hawk
- Chicago Syndicate (1955) as Dolan
- The Desperados Are in Town (1956) as Tom Kesh
- Calypso Heat Wave (1957) as Second Thug
- Raintree County (1957) as Spectator (uncredited)
- Official Detective (1957, TV Series) as Hatch
- Adventures of Superman (1957) (Season 5 Episode 9: ”The Phony Alibi”) as Clippy Jones
- Wagon Train (1957) (Season 1 Episode 2: "The Jean Lebec Story"
- The Lone Ranger (1957, TV Series, season 5, episode 23: “Code of Honor”) as Fake Soldier (uncredited)
- Saddle the Wind (1958) as Barfly (uncredited)
- Twilight for the Gods (1958) as Sweeney
- Alfred Hitchcock Presents (1959) (Season 4 Episode 32: "Human Interest Story") as Barney Welch
- The Sound and the Fury (1959) as Roustabout (uncredited)
- The Story on Page One (1959) as Lemke (uncredited)
- Toby Tyler (1960) as Jailbird (uncredited)
- Noose for a Gunman (1960) as Gorse
- One Foot in Hell (1960) as Pete's Friend (uncredited)
- The Plunderers (1960) as First Citizen
- Cimarron (1960) as Barber (uncredited)
- Alfred Hitchcock Presents (1961) (Season 6 Episode 23: "Incident in a Small Jail") as Petrie
- All Fall Down (1962) as third Bum (uncredited)
- War Hunt (1962) as Lieutenant Colonel
- Gunsmoke (1962) as Feist
- The Alfred Hitchcock Hour (1963) (Season 1 Episode 24: "The Star Juror") as Jess Bartholomew
- The Hook (1963) as Schmidt
- Seven Days in May (1964) as General Riley (uncredited)
- The Alfred Hitchcock Hour (1965) (Season 3 Episode 14: "Final Performance") as Wint Davis
- Nightmare in the Sun (1965) as Old Coot in a bar
- Joy in the Morning (1965) as an Old Derelict (uncredited)
- The Cincinnati Kid (1965) as an Old Man (uncredited)
- Billy the Kid Versus Dracula (1966) as Tom, Station Agent
- Five Easy Pieces (1970) as Nicholas Dupea
- Zachariah (1971) as "The Old Man"
- The Great Northfield Minnesota Raid (1972) as Old-timer (uncredited)
- The Irish Whiskey Rebellion (1972) as Timothy
- Moonchild (1974) as Alchemist
- From Noon till Three (1976) as Piano Player (uncredited) (final film role)
