= Lorenza Saitta =

Italian computer scientist

Lorenza (Lore) Saitta (born 1944) is a retired Italian computer scientist whose research topics in artificial intelligence include concept learning and abstraction. She is a professor emeritus of computer science at the University of Eastern Piedmont.

== Career ==
After earning a laurea (the Italian equivalent of a master's degree), Saitta became a researcher in the institute of experimental physics at the Polytechnic University of Turin. In 1974, at the invitation of Corrado Böhm, Saitta switched her focus to computer science and became a lecturer in computer science at the University of Turin, where Böhm had newly founded a research group. She was promoted to associate professor in 1983. In 1990 she took a full professorship in sociology at the University of Trento, but in 1991 she returned to the faculty of science of the Alessandria campus of the University of Turin, which in 1998 split off to become the University of Eastern Piedmont.

In 2014 she retired, but retained an unpaid professorship in the university's department of science and technological innovation. She was named a professor emeritus in 2015.

== Books ==
Saitta is the coauthor of books including:

- Machine Learning: An Integrated Framework and Its Applications (with Francesco Bergadano and Attilio Giordana, Horwood, 1991)
- Phase Transitions in Machine Learning (with Attilio Giordana and Antoine Cornuéjols, Cambridge University Press, 2011)
- Abstraction in Artificial Intelligence and Complex Systems (with Jean-Daniel Zucker, Springer, 2013)

== Recognition ==
Saitta is a Fellow of the European Association for Artificial Intelligence (formerly ECCAI), elected in 2002.
