= Doyle Lane =

African-American ceramist

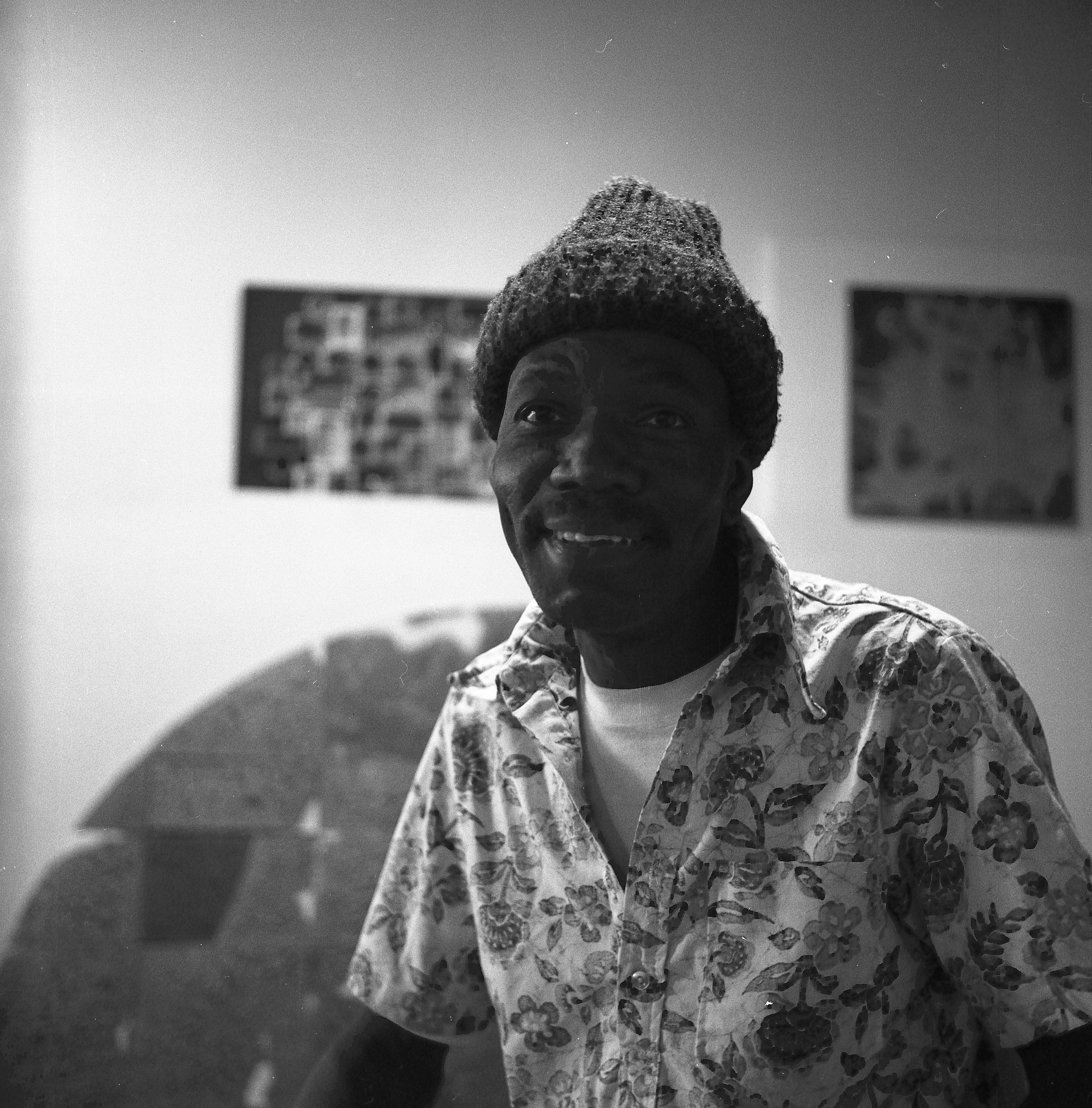
- Born: March 4th 1923; New Orleans, Louisiana
- Died: 2002 (aged 76–77)
- Education: University of Southern California
- Occupation: Studio ceramist
- Known for: Ceramic art

Doyle Lane (1923 – 2002) was an African-American ceramist known for his innovative, tactile glazes. His work ranged from delicate vases and ceramic sculptures to large scale clay paintings and mosaics. Lane maintained a studio in the El Sereno district of East Los Angeles. He exhibited his work at Brockman Gallery in Leimert Park (1968) and Ankrum Gallery on La Cienega Boulevard (1967, 1968), both notable centers for African American Art in Los Angeles in the mid-twentieth century.

== Early life and education ==
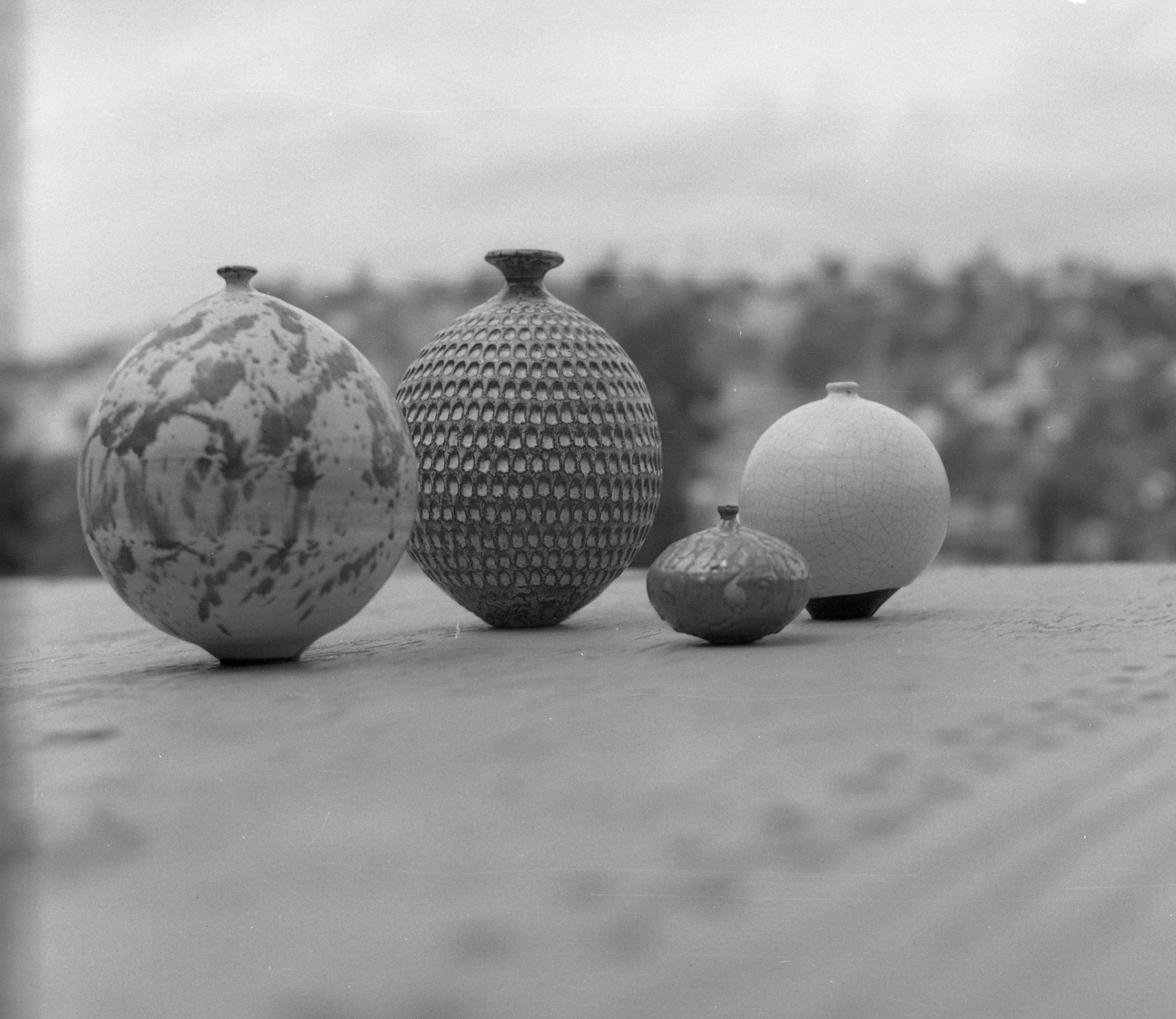
Doyle Lane pots on the studio roof top

Born in New Orleans, he moved to Los Angeles by the late 1940s.

When Doyle Lane was twenty-three, he moved to Los Angeles and resided there for the duration of his life. He studied at Los Angeles City College, East Los Angeles City College before attending the University of Southern California. Early in his career, he worked as a glaze technician for L.H. Butcher and Co. Later he would maintain a self-supporting practice as a studio ceramist.

== Commissions ==
Lane created large-scale clay paintings for many prominent sites in Southern California.

- California Lutheran Nursing Home and Health Center (Alhambra)
- Golden State Bank (Downey)
- Equitable Savings and Loan (Canoga Park)
- International Children's School (Los Angeles)
- Miller Robinson (Santa Fe Springs)
- Mutual Savings and Loan, 1964 (Pasadena), acquired by the Huntington Library
- Pantry Foods (Pasadena)

== Works ==
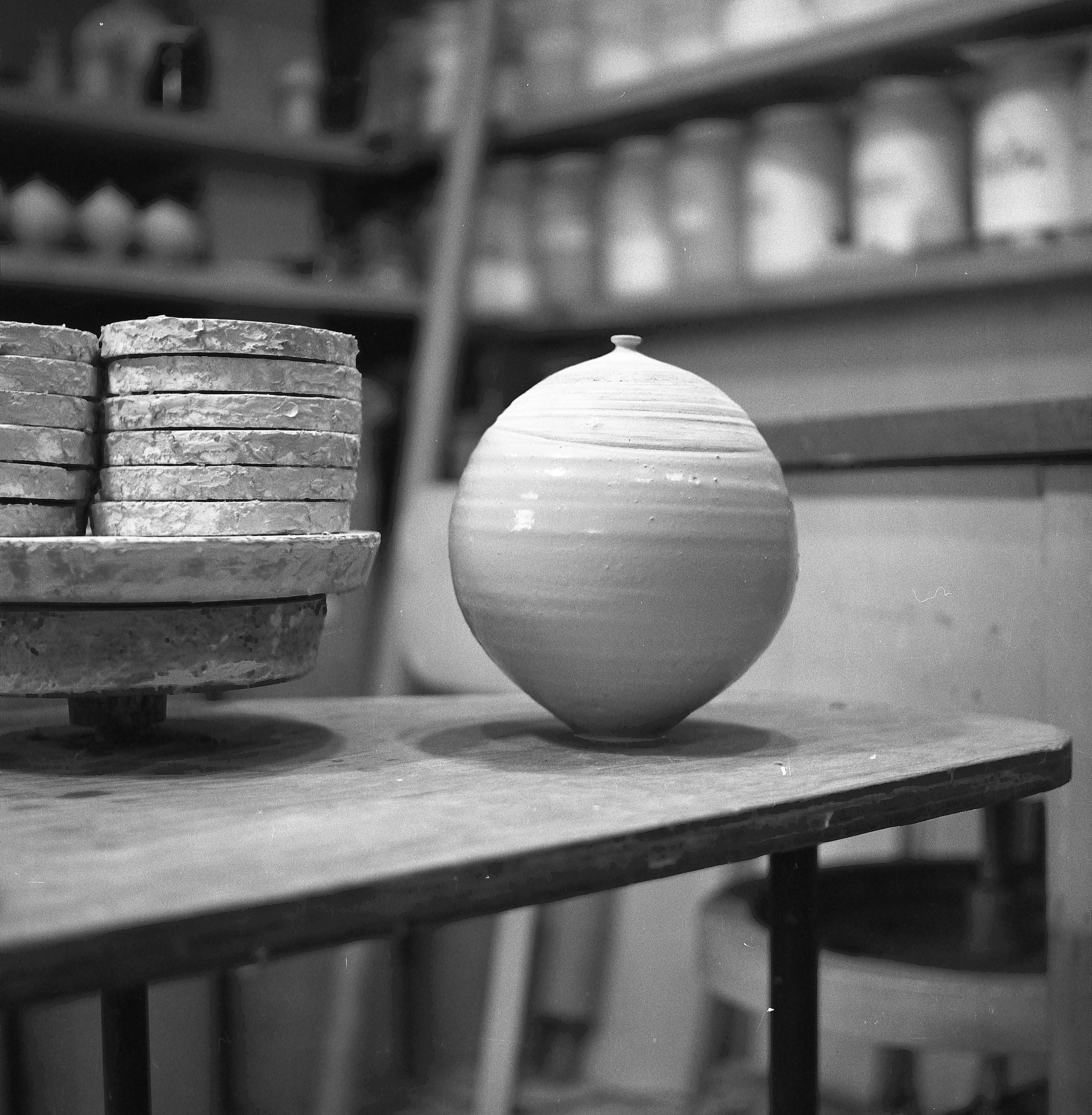
Glazed pot

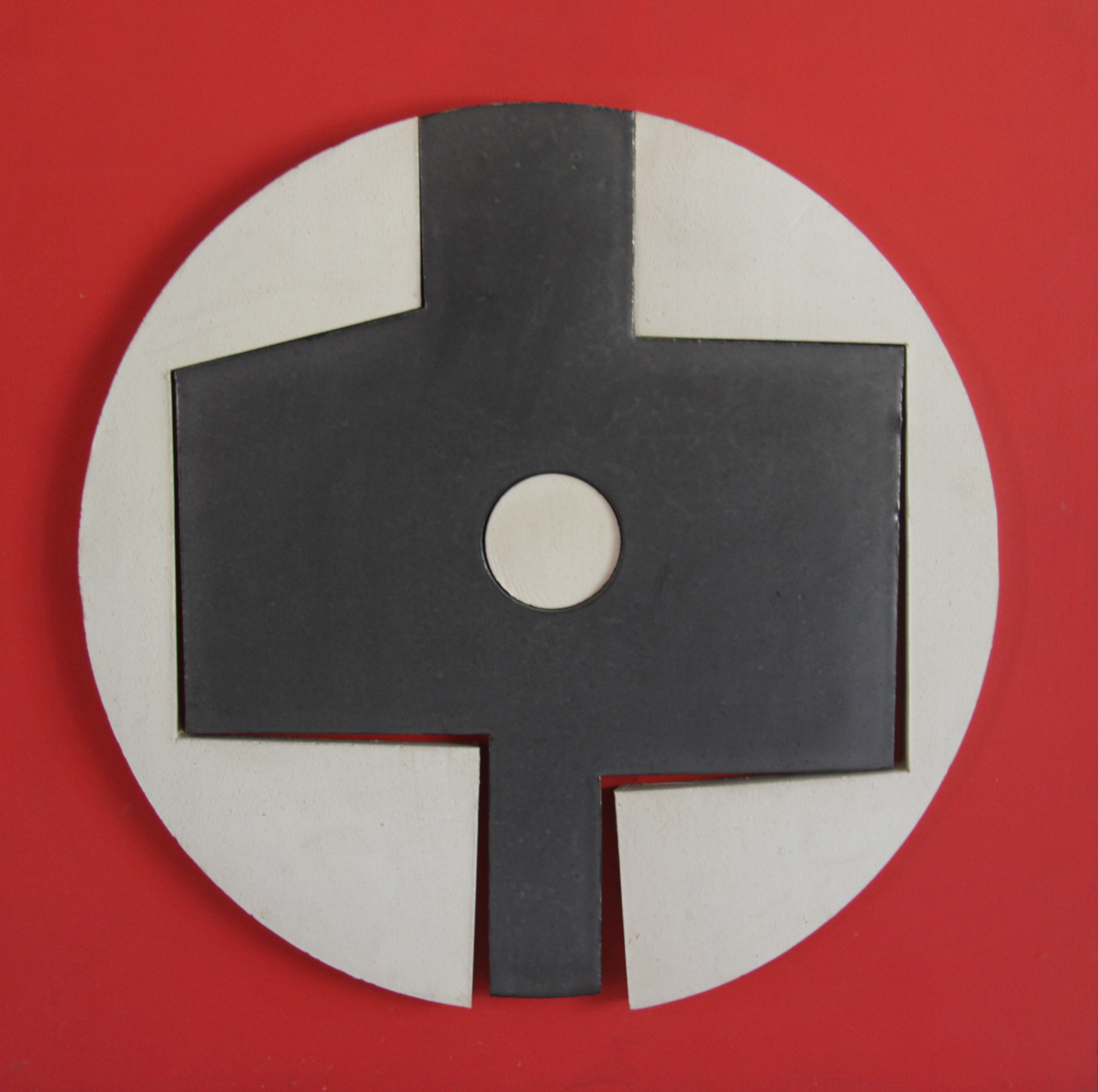
Clay painting

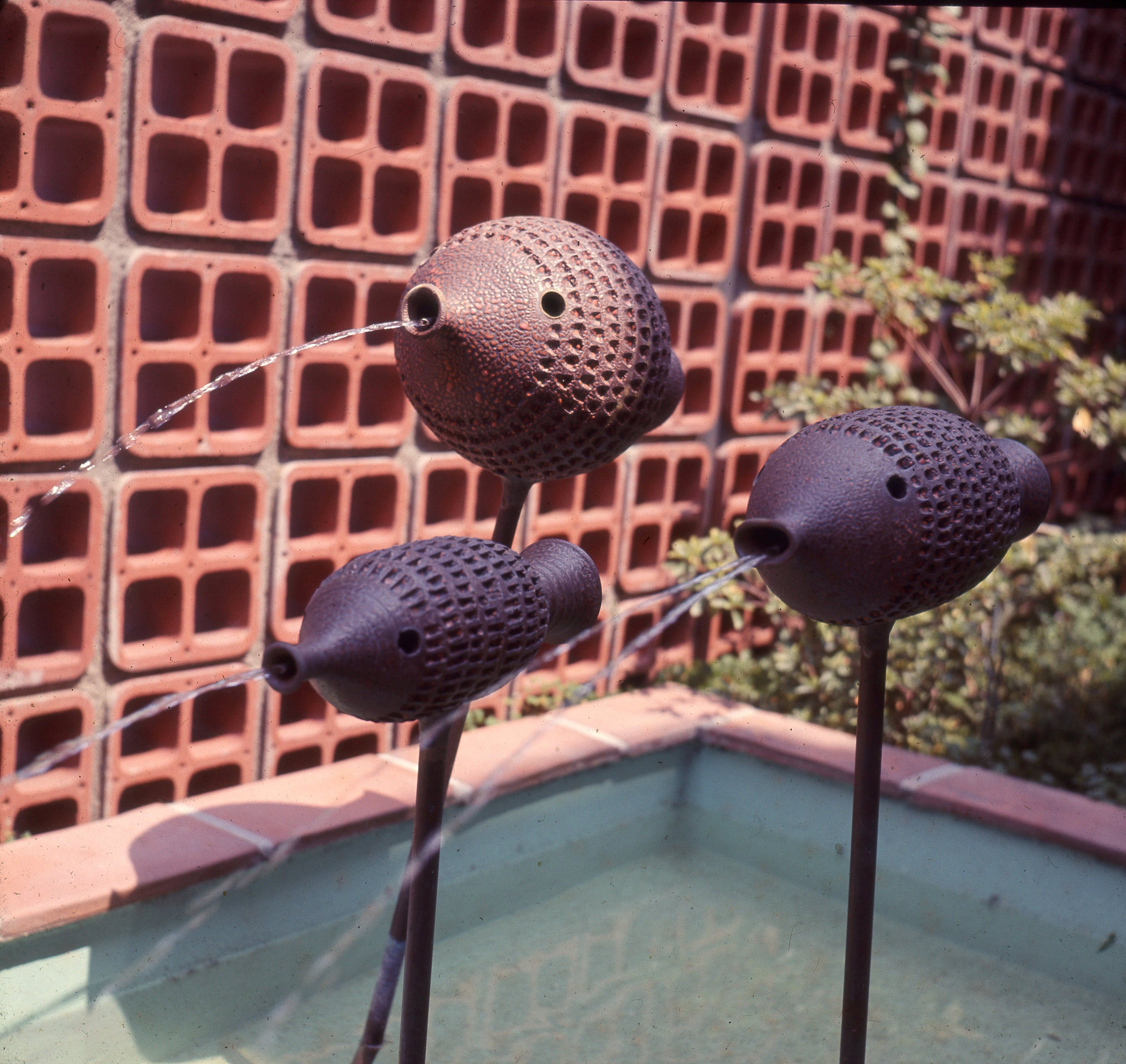
Fish fountain

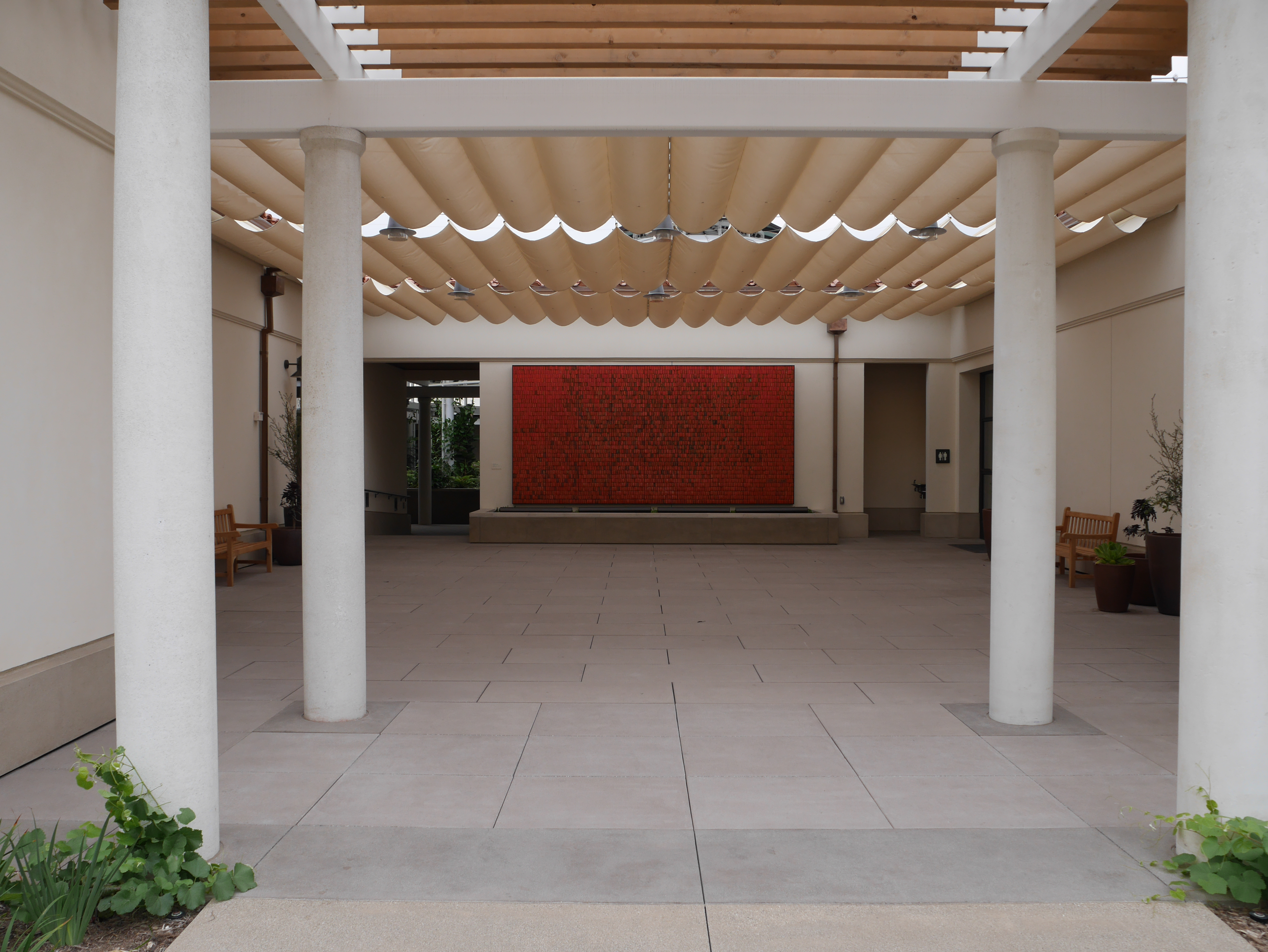
Mural at the Huntington Library

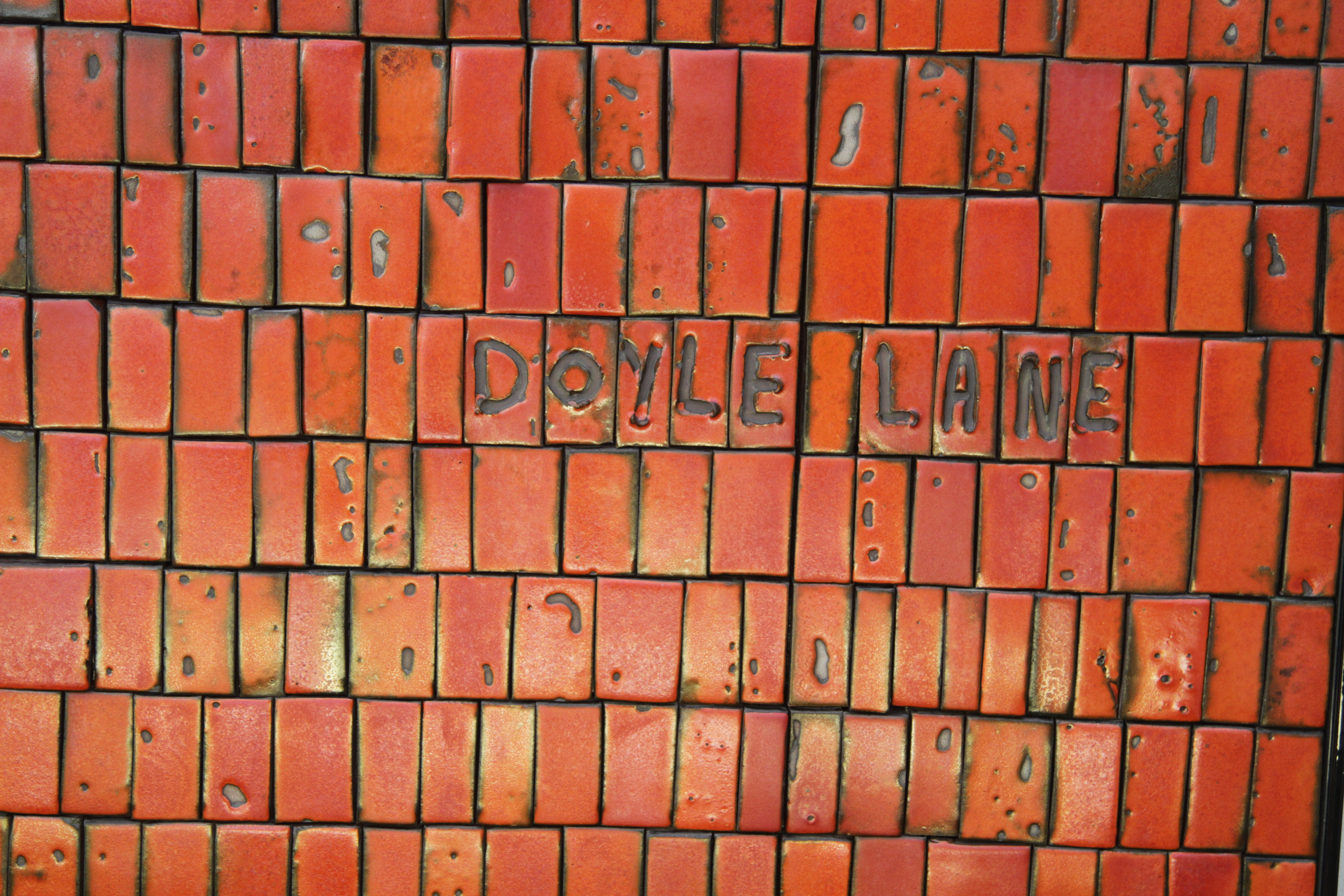
Detail of "Mutual Savings and Loan Mural," 1964 mural at the Huntington Library

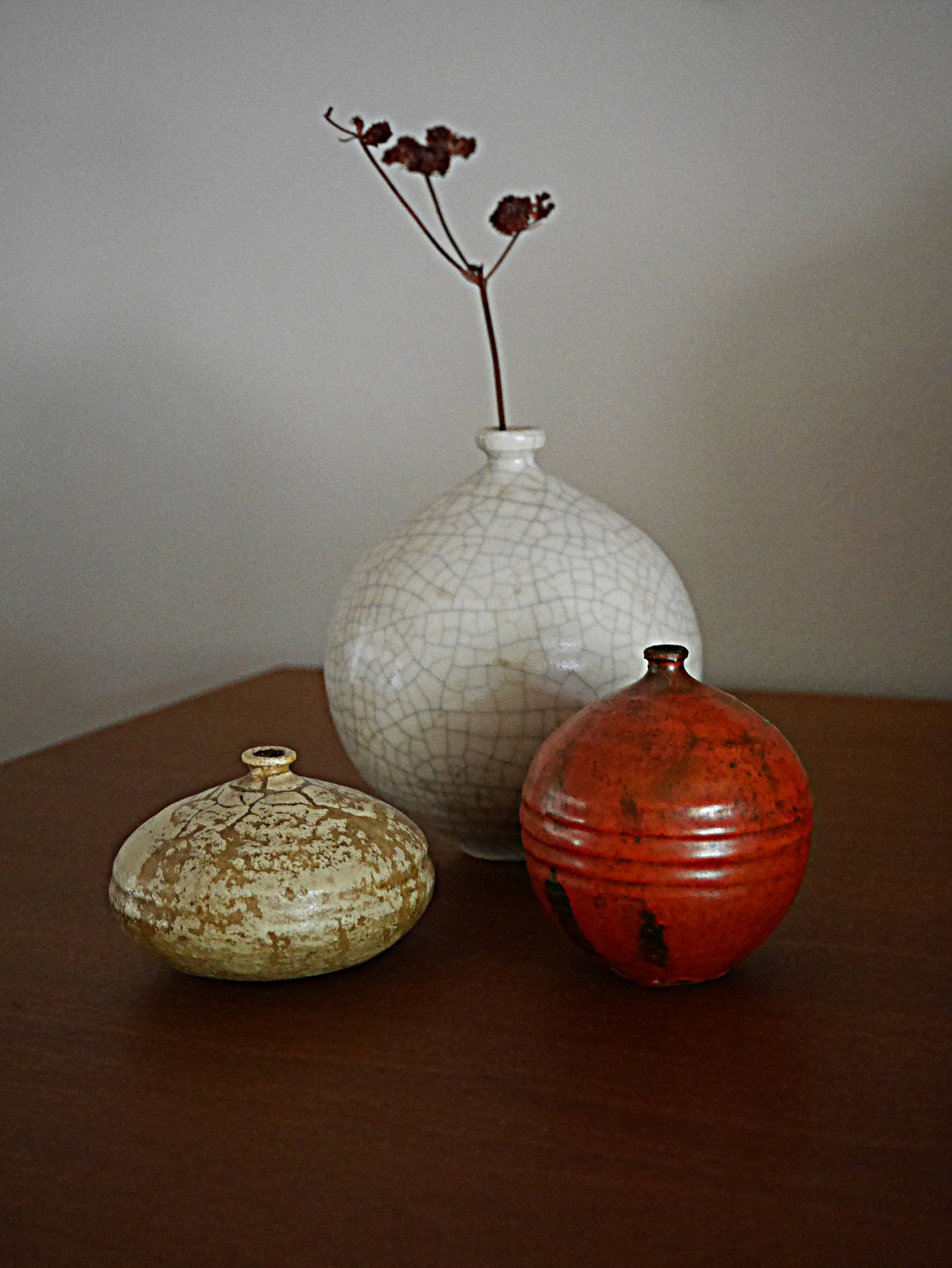
Three Doyle Lane Weed Pots

== Exhibitions ==
- California Design 4, Pasadena Art Museum (1958)
- California Design 5, Pasadena Art Museum (1959)
- California Design 6, Pasadena Art Museum (1960)
- Ankrum Gallery (1967)
- Ankrum Gallery (1968)
- Brockman Gallery (1968)
- Objects: USA (1969)
- California Black Craftsmen, Mills College Art Gallery (1970)
- Solo exhibition at Los Angeles City College Art Gallery (October 1977)
- California Design, 1930-1965: "Living in A Modern Way," Los Angeles County Museum of Art (October 1, 2011- June 3, 2012)
- Doyle Lane: Clay Paintings, The Landing at Reform Gallery (solo exhibition, May 1-July 5, 2014)
- Doyle Lane: Master of Clay, The Huntington (September 13, 2026 - March 1, 2027)

== Collections ==
- Los Angeles County Museum of Art
- Oakland Museum of California
- California African American Museum
- Smithsonian American Art Museum
- Huntington Library
