= Joe Ray (artist) =

American artist

- Born: 1944 (age 81–82); Alexandria, Louisiana, United States
- Education: California Institute of the Arts, University of Southwestern Louisiana
- Known for: Painting, cast-resin sculpture, photography, performance art

Joe Ray, New Eye, cast resin and plexiglas; 7" x 11" x 11", 1969.

Joe Ray (born 1944) is an American artist based in Los Angeles. His work has moved between abstraction and representation and mediums including painting, sculpture, performance art and photography. He began his career in the early 1960s and belonged to several notable art communities in Los Angeles, including the Light and Space movement; early cast-resin sculptors, including Larry Bell; and the influential 1970s African-American collective, Studio Z, of which he was a founding member with artists such as David Hammons, Senga Nengudi and Houston Conwill. Critic Catherine Wagley described Ray as "an artist far more committed to understanding all kinds of light and space (cosmic, psychic, spiritual, and geographical) than to any specific material or strategy"—a tendency that she and others have suggested led to his being under-recognized.

Ray has exhibited at the Museum of Contemporary Art, Los Angeles (MOCA), Los Angeles County Museum of Art (LACMA), San Francisco Museum of Modern Art (SFMOMA), Contemporary Arts Museum Houston, and the Museum of African-American Art in Los Angeles, among other venues. His artwork belongs to the public collections of LACMA and the Nora Eccles Harrison Museum of Art.

== Early life and career ==
Ray was born in 1944 in Alexandria, Louisiana. After taking high school courses in industrial metalwork, art and music, he studied fine arts at the University of Southwestern Louisiana, one of only a few black students in the previously segregated college. In 1963, he traveled to Los Angeles by bus and soon joined its diverse, still-undefined art scene. He was drafted into the U.S. Army and sent to serve in Vietnam in 1965, two weeks after the Watts Rebellion. When he returned from Vietnam in 1967, Ray settled in the Leimert Park neighborhood of Los Angeles, a burgeoning center of historical and contemporary African-American culture, and began experimenting with resin-based sculpture alongside others such as Larry Bell, Doug Edge and Terry O'Shea.

Ray first showed his artwork in the 1969 4th Annual Watts Summer Festival Art Exhibition, and subsequently received recognition through group exhibitions at SFMOMA, Oakland Museum of California, Long Beach Museum of Art, and LACMA ("24 Young Los Angeles Artists," 1971; "10 Years of Contemporary Art Council Acquisitions," 1973). After receiving a Young Talent Award from LACMA in 1970, he enrolled in the first class at the new California Institute of the Arts, where he studied with John Baldessari, Allan Kaprow and Nam June Paik. While there, he experimented with performance, photography and video art and graduated with a BFA in the inaugural class of 1973. Between 1978 and 1980, he was one of fifteen original members of the MOCA Los Angeles Artists Advisory Council, alongside Vija Celmins, Robert Irwin and others.

Joe Ray, Untitled (detail), thirty-one gelatin-silver prints; overall size, 52" x 52", 1970–2. Collection of LACMA.

In his later career, Ray was included in the LACMA exhibition, "Made In California: Art, Image and Identity (1900–2000)," the assemblage-art survey "L.A. Object & David Hammons Body Prints" (2007, Tilton Gallery, New York; Roberts & Tilton, Los Angeles), "The Artist's Museum" (MOCA LA, 2010), and Prospect.3 in New Orleans, among others. In 2017, a 50-year survey of his work, "Complexion Constellation," took place at Diane Rosenstein Gallery in Los Angeles.

== Work and reception ==
Ray's work in the 1960s and 1970s ranged from abstract cast-resin sculpture to documentary-like photography and performance-related works. Critics suggest that the two latter types of work speak to an element of identity that has permeated his otherwise non-figurative practice and differentiated him from other cast-resin and Light and Space artists. Beginning in the late 1970s, he focused more on abstract and symbolic mixed-media paintings that investigate inner and outer space and issues involving racial identity and inequality. Critic Shana Nys Dambrot has written that the apparent eclecticism of Ray's practice "nevertheless posits a thread of conceptual and aesthetic gestalt that links all his works on a continuum of light, color, optical/ambiguous phenomena, and the sociopolitical context for perception, portraiture, performance, and abstraction."

=== Cast-resin sculpture ===
In the mid-1960s, Ray began exploring sculpture cast with resin, a new material for artists that—along with light—came to define the Light and Space movement. These sculptors, including Ray, embraced both scientific, technical aspects of the material and its more esoteric, perception-altering properties, such as the ability to take on solid form and be animated by transient light and movement in its surroundings. Ray's early resin sculptures were translucent and employed basic shapes: pristine spheres, half-spheres, arcs and rings. He added pigments to them—in some cases candy-colored hues (Two Arcs and Half-Sphere, 1969) and in others black and white values, as in New Eye (1969). The latter work connected him to both Light and Space artists and—with its black and white tubes referencing racial issues—to an alternative, African-American art world south of Freeway 10, centered around Leimert Park, Alonzo Davis and Dale Brockman Davis's Brockman Gallery, and Gallery 32.

Ray's resin works convey his interests in science and spirit, euphoric perception, the individual human body and its systems, and the cosmos. His later Rings and Spheres (1980–3) has been described as a work of painstaking craftsmanship whose seven deep-colored, opaque rings and spheres placed side-by-side conjure a wide range of metaphors. Curator Ed Schad wrote, the sculpture "draws a humanistic line from the infinitesimal world of the atomic nucleus through the structure of the human heart to the patterns of stars and solar systems," with its seven pairings linking to that number's "mystical and numerological meanings, adding a cryptic edge."

=== Photography and performance-related work ===
Curators situate Ray's 1970s photography among artists drawn to recording daily urban life and the sometimes-uneasy relationship between people and their surroundings. In 1970, he returned to his Louisiana hometown and photographed the children, adults, shotgun houses and streets there. The candid, documentary-like portraits—31 black-and-white, gelatin-silver prints—comprised the "Untitled" series (1970–2), which conveyed his feeling about the neighborhood and its life, while charting the scope of his own trajectory over time and place.

Joe Ray, Flaming Star Nebula #1, acrylic and spray paint on canvas; 96" x 60", 2017.

Contemporaneous to that series were Ray's collaborative performance art projects—humorous scenarios and staged live events that were often documented in photographs and video. These included, for example, a human car wash, for which he and friends dressed as large, floppy brushes and covered themselves in white foam, and an on-stage descent on ropes from a ceiling trapdoor during a music concert. In 1971, Ray, Terry O’Shea and Doug Edge were featured in the inaugural exhibition of the Market Street Program (1971–3), an early, artist- and socially driven project supported by Walter Hopps and Robert Irwin. Rather than present their individual resin sculpture, they chose to experiment as a trio with conceptual ideas and photography exploring popular clichés about contemporary artists—as dandy, outsider, libertine or romantic—titling the result, "The Fantasy Show." Their images included a tacky, Buñuel-like black-tie banquet for three; a scruffy, shirtless biker scenario spoofing machismo; and a poker game with Ray and three women, referencing the famed 1963 Duchamp photograph of himself playing chess in the Pasadena Art Museum.

=== Painting ===
In the late 1970s, Ray's interest in the phenomenological qualities of resin led him to contemplations of the night sky, whose qualities—remote depth of color, refraction of space, dark air and white light—similarly combined science, imagination and emotional expressiveness. He explored these concerns in the "Nebula Paintings," a series of celestial landscapes employing acrylics, spray paint and mixed media that he has continued to produce into the 2020s. His earlier Nebula paintings combined colorful gestural and atmospherics with a careful use of pointed terms that reflected the context of their making; for example, the painting In Space (1980) bears ghostly text reading "race" and "complexion constellation." Critics have described his later "Nebula" works as more vibrant and hypnotic works that "conflate the properties of post-Impressionism and actionist Ab Ex, the emotional allegory of literally nebulous abstraction, and the cosmic bent of space-travel science" (e.g., Flaming Star Nebula #1, 2017; Red Yellow Black White and Burnt Sienna, 2020).

Joe Ray, US, acrylic on canvas, cotton fabric, on panel; 48" × 72", 1993. Collection of LACMA.

In the 1990s, Ray created assemblage-paintings that probed issues of identity, racial justice and inclusion through a fluid use of imagery—as symbols and formal elements—that subverted negative stereotypes and racial epithets. One year after the Los Angeles riots sparked by the Rodney King police brutality case and acquittal, he completed a series including the works US and Blue Spade (both 1993); the former work's title refers to both the United States and the contradictions of the pronoun "us," which can function inclusively or divisively, as in "us vs. them." The series juxtaposed symbols of freedom and equality and repression and protest: a gazelle mask symbolizing the African continent; kente cloth, a Ghanaian textile with significance to the West African diaspora that he used in place of an American flag's traditional blue field; flowers seemingly growing out of concrete; splashes of black paint suggesting stained urban sidewalks, anger or Abstract Expressionism; a whip painted white, a blood-red cross, and spade forms evoking a racial slur, card games and a tool.

In 2014, the series was presented at Prospect.3 in New Orleans, in the aftermath of the Michael Brown shooting; In a The New Orleans Times-Picayune review, Doug McCash wrote, "Encountering Ray's paintings and reading their backstory in the fall of 2014 was a chilling experience that emphasized art's power to mark a moment ... or moments."
