= Dan Concholar =

American Visual Artist

Dan Concholar (May 23, 1939 – February 1, 2017) was an American painter and arts organizer. Educated under Charles White at the Otis Art Institute, he was active in the Los Angeles scene in the 1970s and in New York City in the 1980s. His work was included in the "Dig This!: Art and Black Los Angeles 1960–1980" at the Hammer Museum in Los Angeles which travelled to MoMA P.S.1 in New York City in 2012.

== Early life and education ==
Concholar was born May 23, 1939, in San Antonio, Texas to Alvin Dorsey, a Black Texas cowboy, and Rubena Cocholar. His family, which included three sisters and three brothers, moved to Phoenix in the 1940s. He moved in with his sister in Los Angeles where finished high school. He spent one year at Phoenix College before returning to L.A. to attend the Otis Art Institute, where he studied under the painter Charles White. White proved influential as well as Cocolar's encounters with David Hammons, John Riddle, and Timothy Washington.

== Career ==
Early in his career Concholar was influenced by Impressionism and Abstract Expressionism. While working in illustration and abstraction, he was swept up in the social movements of the 1960s. Around 1969 he became active in the Black Arts Council (BAC), a Los Angeles group that shared information about the arts and sought to make the works of black artists more well-known. The group's lobbying in the early 1970s of the Los Angeles County Museum of Art paid off with three major exhibitions focusing on Black artists: "Three Graphic Artists: Charles White, David Hammons, and Timothy Washington" (1971), "Los Angeles 1972: A Panorama of Black Artists" (1972), and Two Centuries of Black American Art (1976)

Concholar had an active presence in the Los Angeles gallery scene, showing at Brockman Gallery and Gallery 32. He also directed the Watts Towers Art Center, until he moved to New York City in 1980 at the encouragement of his friend David Hammons. There he was introduced to Linda Goode Bryant, the founding director of Just Above Midtown Gallery (JAM) whose roster included other artists who had made the same move to New York City from Los Angeles, among them Hammons, Senga Nengudi, Maren Hassinger, and Houston Conwill. Concholar who began working at the gallery, too, began exhibiting his work there. He also stayed active organizing artists by directing of the Art Information Center in the 1980s, an organization that helped them develop gallery representation. He was also involved with the Foundation for the Community of Artists.

For "Dig This!: Art and Black Los Angeles 1960–1980", curated by Kellie Jones, Concholar showed an installation of a suitcase Charles White had given him he had left and found at Just Above Midtown Gallery, stuffed with Cocholar's personal bills, magazines, his afro pick, and ticket stubs to different museums in L.A. The found object also originally contained the works of two artists, Ruth Waddy and George Clack. Jillian Steinhauer of Hyperallergic called the piece, "a microcosm of the entire show," an exhibition that she described as "so good — so well-curated, so full of fantastic art, so revelatory — that it was worth bringing to New York no matter what."

Concholar's work is in the Mott-Warsh Collection, among others.

== Personal life ==
He was married to Olivia Diaz with whom they had three children, Alvin Derek, Leslie, and Denise. Diaz and Cocholar divorced.

== Death ==
Concholar moved to Nevada City, California to be cared for my his surviving daughter Leslie and her family. Six years later, he moved into a rehabilitation facility in Grass Valley, where he died on February 1, 2017. The Arizona Republic reported in his obituary that he liked to say, "The art world is racist, sexist, elitist, and completely wonderful!"
