= Ana Mendieta =

Cuban-American artist (1948–1985)

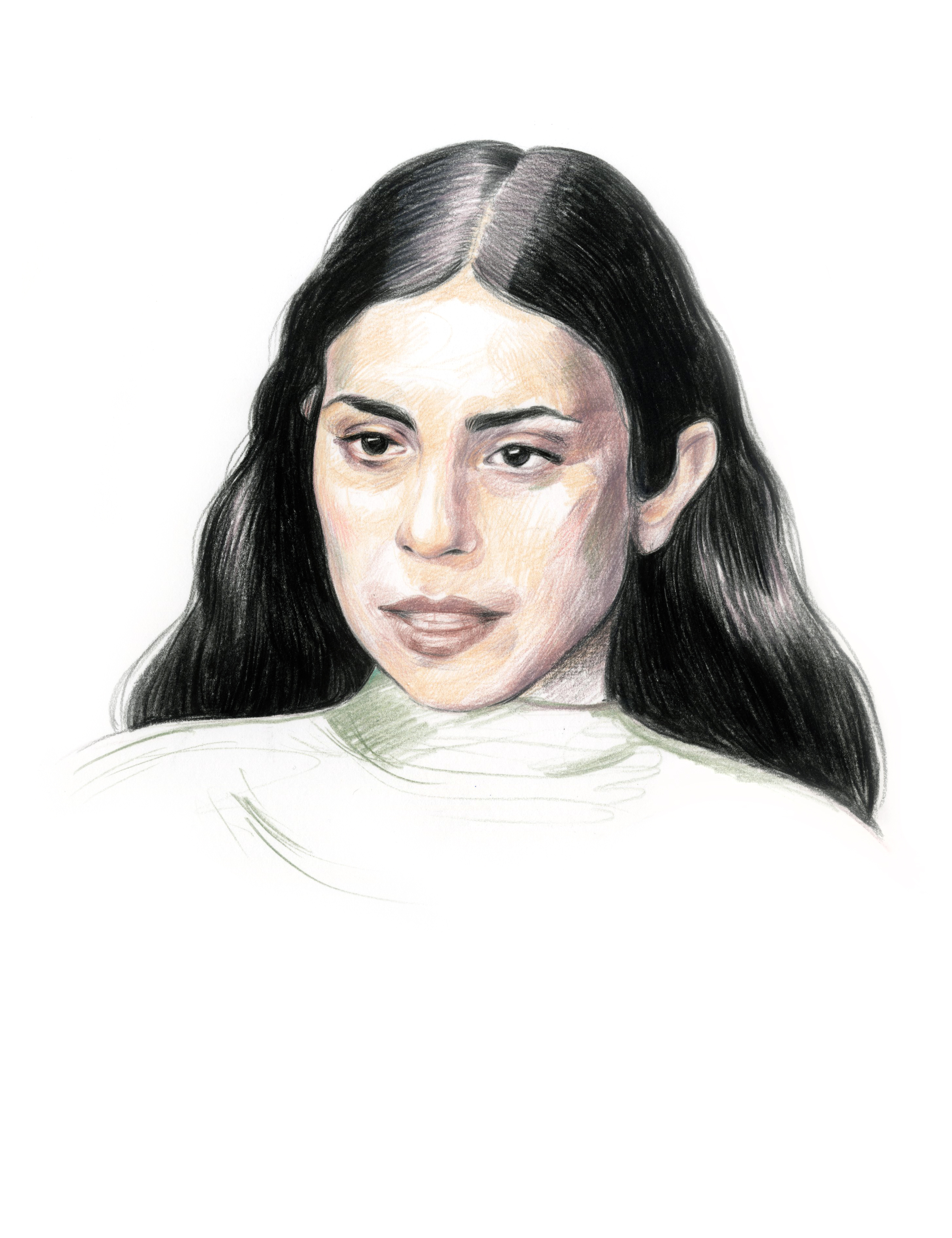
- Ana Mendieta
- Born: November 18, 1948; Havana, Cuba
- Died: September 8, 1985 (aged 36); New York City, US
- Citizenship: Cuba; United States
- Known for: Performance art; sculpture; video art
- Spouse: Carl Andre (m. 1985)

Ana Mendieta (November 18, 1948 – September 8, 1985) was a Cuban-American performance artist, sculptor, painter, and video artist who is best known for her "earth-body" artwork. She is considered one of the most influential Cuban-American artists of the post–World War II era. She is best known for the Silueta series (1973-1985), in which she made female silhouettes in mud, sand and grass. Born in Havana, Cuba, Mendieta left for the United States in 1961. She was sent at age 12 with her sister through Operations Pedro Pan and raised in Iowa foster homes and institutions. She was awarded the Roma Prize by the American Academy in Rome in 1983, and her work has been the subject of retrospectives including one at the Hirshhorn Museum in 2004.

Mendieta died on September 8, 1985, in New York City, after falling from her 34th-floor apartment. She lived there with her husband of eight months, minimalist sculptor Carl Andre. The circumstances surrounding her death have been the subject of controversy. Neighbors heard Mendieta shouting "No" multiple times immediately before the fall followed by the thud of her body on a roof below. Andre told police it was a suicide and was acquitted of murdering her in a bench trial, sparking outrage amongst feminists who maintained that Mendieta was murdered.

== Early life and exile ==
Mendieta was born on November 18, 1948, in Havana, Cuba, to a wealthy family prominent in the country's politics and society. Her father, Ignacio Alberto Mendieta de Lizáur, was an attorney and the nephew of Carlos Mendieta, who was installed as president by Fulgencio Batista for just under two years. Her mother, Raquel Oti de Rojas, was a chemist, a researcher, and the granddaughter of Carlos María de Rojas, a sugar mill owner celebrated for his role in the war against Spain for Cuban independence.

Ana, aged 12, and her 15-year-old sister Raquelin, were sent to the United States by their parents to live in Dubuque, Iowa, through Operation Pedro Pan, a collaborative program run by the US government and Catholic Charities, which enabled Cuban children to flee Fidel Castro's government. Ana and Raquelin were among 14,000 children who migrated to the United States through the program in 1961. The sisters were able to stay together during that time due to a power of attorney signed by their parents, which mandated that they not be separated. The two sisters spent their first weeks in refugee camps, and then moved between several institutions and foster homes throughout Iowa. In 1966, Mendieta and her sisters were reunited with their mother, Raquel and younger brother, Ignacio. Her father joined them in 1979, having spent 18 years in a political prison in Cuba for his involvement in the Bay of Pigs invasion.

== Education ==
In Cuba, Ana Mendieta grew up as a sheltered, upper-class child. She attended an all-girls Catholic private school. When she and her sister were sent to Iowa, they were enrolled in a reform school because the court wanted to avoid sending them to a state institution. When Mendieta studied English in school, her vocabulary was very limited. In junior high school, she discovered a love for art. Mendieta majored in French and minored art, but when she transferred to the University of Iowa, she was inspired by the avant-garde community and the hills of Iowa's landscape. She earned a BA (enrolled 1969–1972) and MA in painting, and an MFA (enrolled 1972–1977) in Intermedia under the instruction of acclaimed artist Hans Breder. She faced a great deal of discrimination while in art school. In college, Mendieta's work focused on blood and violence toward women. Her interest in spiritualism, religion, and primitive rituals developed during this time. After graduate school, she moved to New York City. “Seeing her in New York was always a joy because she always had friends around her,” said her longtime friend Sherry Buckberrough, a retired art history professor. “She networked very well, so there was always some event that we would go to. And there would always be a party later, that’s for sure.”

== Work ==
Still from Blood + Feathers (1974) at the Hirshhorn Museum and Sculpture Garden in 2022

In the course of her career, Mendieta created works in Cuba, Mexico, Italy, and the United States. Her work was somewhat autobiographical, drawing from her history of being displaced from her native Cuba, and focused on themes including feminism, violence, life, death, identity, place, and belonging. Many of her works included ephemeral outdoor performances and photographs, sculptures and drawings. Her works are generally associated with the four classical elements. Mendieta often focused on a spiritual and physical connection with the earth. She felt that by uniting her body with the earth she could become whole again: "Through my earth/body sculptures, I become one with the earth ... I become an extension of nature and nature becomes an extension of my body. This obsessive act of reasserting my ties with the earth is really the reactivation of primeval beliefs ... [in] an omnipresent female force, the after image of being encompassing within the womb, is a manifestation of my thirst for being." During her lifetime, Mendieta produced more than 200 works of art using earth as a sculptural medium. Her techniques were mainly influenced by Afro-Cuban traditions.

=== Rape Scene (1973 Moffitt Street, Iowa City, Iowa) ===
Mendieta's first use of blood to make art was in 1972, when she performed Untitled (Death of a Chicken). In this performance, she stood naked in front of a white wall holding a freshly decapitated chicken by its feet as its blood spattered her naked body. In 1973, Mendieta performed Rape Scene, which commented on the rape and murder of a fellow student that had been committed on the University of Iowa campus by another student. In the performance, Mendieta invited friends and other students to visit her in her Moffitt Building apartment on East College Street. Upon arriving at her apartment, viewers were confronted with the image of Mendieta, naked from the waist down, smeared with blood, bent over, and bound to a table. Mendieta recalls that after encountering her body, her audience "all sat down, and started talking about it. I didn’t move. I stayed in position about an hour. It really jolted them." The interaction between the people who stayed to observe and talk about her work (Rape Scene) and the artist herself (Ana Mendieta) was a means of processing the actual crime that had occurred at the University of Iowa.

Professor and art historian Kaira Cabañas writes about Untitled (Rape Scene):

Her body was the subject and object of the work. She used it to emphasize the societal conditions by which the female body is colonized as the object of male desire and ravaged under masculine aggression. Mendieta's corporeal presence demanded the recognition of a female subject. The previously invisible, unnamed victim of rape gained an identity. The audience was forced to reflect on its responsibility; its empathy was elicited and translated to the space of awareness in which sexual violence could be addressed.

In a slide series, People Looking at Blood Moffitt (1973), she poured blood and rags on a sidewalk and photographed people walking by without stopping until the man next door (the storefront window bears the name H.F. Moffitt) came out to clean it up.

=== Involvement in the A.I.R. ===
In 1978, Ana Mendieta joined the Artists In Residence Inc (A.I.R. Gallery) in New York, which was the first gallery for women to be established in the United States. The venture gave her the opportunity to network with other women artists at the forefront of the era's feminist movement. During that time, Mendieta was also actively involved in the administration and maintenance of the A.I.R. In an unpublished statement, she noted, "It is crucial for me to be a part of all my art works. As a result of my participation, my vision becomes a reality and part of my experiences." At the same time, after two years of involvement with A.I.R., she concluded that "American Feminism as it stands is basically a white middle class movement," and she sought to challenge the limits of this perspective through her art. She met her future husband Carl Andre at the gallery, when he served on a panel titled "How has women's art practices affected male artist social attitudes?" Her resignation in 1982 is attributed, in part, to a dispute instigated by Andre over a collaborative art piece the couple had submitted. In a 2001 journal article, Kat Griefen, director of A.I.R. from 2006 to 2011, wrote,

The letter of resignation did not cite any reasons for her departure, but a number of fellow A.I.R. artists remember the related events. For a recent benefit Mendieta and Carl Andre had donated a collaborative piece. As was the policy, all works needed to be delivered by the artist. Edelson recalls that Andre took offense, instigating a disagreement, which, in part, led to Mendieta's resignation. Even without this incident, according to another member, Pat Lasch, Mendieta's association with the now legendary Andre surely played some role in her decision.

In 1983, Mendieta was awarded the Rome Prize by the American Academy in Rome. While living in Rome, Mendieta began creating art "objects", including drawings and sculptures. She continued to use natural elements in her work.

=== Silueta Series (1973–1985) ===
Nile Born (1984), from the Silueta Series, at the Museum of Modern Art in 2022

In her Silueta Series (1973–1985), Mendieta created female silhouettes in nature—in mud, sand, and grass—with natural materials ranging from leaves and twigs to blood, and made body prints or painted her outline or silhouette onto a wall. She did this to express herself becoming part of the earth and to embody a process of rituals (Abby, 2015).

In a 1981 artist statement, Mendieta said:

I have been carrying out a dialogue between the landscape and the female body (based on my own silhouette). I believe this has been a direct result of my having been torn from my homeland (Cuba) during my adolescence. I am overwhelmed by the feeling of having been cast from the womb (nature). My art is the way I re-establish the bonds that unite me to the universe. It is a return to the maternal source.

When she began her Silueta Series in the 1970s, Mendieta was one of many artists experimenting with the emerging genres of land art, body art, and performance art. The films and photographs of Siluetas are connected to the figures surrounding her body. Mendieta was possibly the first to combine these genres in what she called "earth-body" sculptures. She often used her naked body to explore and connect with the Earth, as seen in her piece Imagen de Yagul from the series Silueta Works, Mexico, 1973–1977. The Silueta Works, Mexico, 1973–1977 series was featured in the group show My Body, My Rules at the Pérez Art Museum Miami between 2020–2021.

Untitled (Ochún) (1981), named for the Santería goddess of waters, once pointed southward from the shore at Key Biscayne, Florida. Ñañigo Burial (1976), with a title taken from the popular name for an Afro-Cuban religious brotherhood, is a floor installation of black candles dripping wax in the outline of the artist's body. Through these works, which involve performance, film, and photography, Mendieta explored her relationship with a place as well as a larger relationship with Mother Earth or the "Great Goddess" figure.

Mary Jane Jacob suggests in her exhibition catalog Ana Mendieta: The "Silueta" Series (1973–1980) that much of Mendieta's work was influenced by her interest in the religion Santería, as well as a connection to Cuba. Jacob attributes Mendieta's "ritualistic use of blood" and the use of gunpowder, earth, and rock, to Santería's ritualistic traditions.

Jacob also points out the significance of the mother figure, referring to the Mayan deity Ix Chel, the mother of the gods. Many have interpreted Mendieta's recurring use of this mother figure and her own female silhouette as feminist art. However, because Mendieta's work explores many ideas including life, death, identity, and place all at once, it cannot be categorized as part of one idea or movement. Claire Raymond argues that the Silueta Series, as a photographic archive, should be read for its photographicity rather than merely as documentation of earthworks.

In Corazon de Roca con Sangre (Rock Heart with Blood) (1975) Mendieta kneels next to an impression of her body that has been cut into the soft, muddy riverbank.

=== Photo etchings of the Rupestrian Sculptures (1981) ===
As documented in the book Ana Mendieta: A Book of Works (edited by Bonnie Clearwater), before her death, Mendieta was working on a series of photo-etchings of cave sculptures she had created at Escaleras de Jaruco, Jaruco State Park in Havana, Cuba. She had returned to the island as part of a cultural exchange group and was eager to begin exploring her birthplace after having spent 19 years in exile. The soft limestone and undulating landscapes provided a new scope for Mendieta's art as she began to explore the cultural identity that she had long been forsaken. Her sculptures were entitled Rupestrian Sculptures (1981)—the title refers to living among rocks—and the book of photographic etchings that Mendieta created to preserve these sculptures is a testament to the intertextuality of her work. Clearwater explains that the photographs of Mendieta's sculptures were often as important as the piece they were documenting because the nature of Mendieta's work was so impermanent. She spent as much time and thought on the creation of the photographs as she did on the sculptures themselves.

Although Mendieta returned to Havana for this project, she was still exploring her sense of displacement and loss, according to Clearwater. The Rupestrian Sculptures that Mendieta created were also influenced by the Taíno people, "native inhabitants of the pre-Hispanic Antilles", whom Mendieta became fascinated by and studied.

Mendieta completed five photo-etchings of the Rupestrian Sculptures before she died in 1985. The book Ana Mendieta: A Book of Works, published in 1993, contains both photographs of the sculptures and Mendieta's notes on the project.

=== Body Tracks (1982) ===
Body Tracks (Rastros Corporales) debuted on April 8, 1982, at the Franklin Furnace in New York City. Mendieta wore a white long-sleeved shirt with the sleeves on the posterior side of her forearms soaked in blood. She stood close to the white wall with arms raised in a “Y” position. She then slowly dragged her arms, pressing them firmly against the wall, creating long, blurry tracks or marks. The marks were made of a mixture of tempera paint and animal blood.

The performance was documented in the 1987 film Ana Mendieta: Fuego de Tierra, and described by scholar Alexandra Gonzenbach:

In the short piece, the artist enters the studio space, while Cuban music plays in the background. She dips her hands and forearms into animal blood, places her back to the camera, lifts her arms and places them on a large sheet of white paper attached to a wall, and then proceeds to slowly drag her arms down the page, until almost reaching the bottom. She then walks off screen and out of the performance space. The camera, documentation, and performance stops.

The resultant pieces of paper were preserved by Mendieta after the event, and appear in the collection of the Rose Art Museum at Brandeis University. A still photo from the exhibit was the cover art of the Third Woman Press edition of the feminist anthology This Bridge Called My Back: Writings by Radical Women of Color (2002, ISBN 0943219221).

=== Film works (1971–1980) ===
In the 1970s, Mendieta made several experimental films. These include:

- Creek (1974): This film builds on the Shakespearean character of Ophelia. It was shot in San Felipe Creek, Oaxaca, Mexico. In the film, Mendieta merges with the water.
- Chicken Movie, Chicken Piece (1972)
- Parachute (1973)
- Moffitt Building Piece (1973)
- Grass Breathing (1974)
- Dog (1974)
- Mirage (1974)
- Weather Balloon, Feathered Balloon (1974)
- Silueta Sangrienta (1975)
- Energy Charge (1975)
- Ochún (1981): Mendieta filmed Ochun in Key Biscayne, Florida. It is about the Santería goddess, Ochún—the Orisha of the river. It features sand silhouettes, seagull sounds, and ocean waves, and emphasizes themes of longing for another land. It was her last film.
- Untitled (1981): "focuses on the outline of a figure Mendieta carved into the shoreline in Guanabo, a beach town in the artist’s home country of Cuba. Derived from Mendieta’s interest in indigenous Caribbean religion, and themes of exile and return, the shape of the female figure would become a common motif in Mendieta’s work by the early 1980s."
- Esculturas Rupestres (Rupestrian Sculptures; 1981): "emphasizes the importance of documentation in grasping the full scope of her practice."
- Birth (Gunpowder Works; 1981): "features a female silhouette sculpted from wet mud as it sparks and burns out amid the landscape."

In 2016, a traveling exhibition of her film work was mounted by the Katherine E. Nash Gallery of the University of Minnesota with the title Covered in Time and History: The Films of Ana Mendieta.

=== Film works released posthumously (1985–present) ===
The Estate of Ana Mendieta Collection, LLC, and family members found several films after her death while looking for work to be included in a retrospective at the New Museum in 1987. In 2016, more films were uncovered and digitized in anticipation of a documentary directed by the artist's niece, Raquel Cecilia Mendieta.

- Pain of Cuba/Body I Am (2018)
- The Earth That Covers Us Speaks (2018)

== Solo exhibitions ==
Mendieta presented a solo exhibition of her photographs at A.I.R. Gallery in New York in 1979. She also curated and wrote the introductory catalog essay for an exhibition at A.I.R. in 1981 titled Dialectics of Isolation: An Exhibition of Third World Women Artists of the United States, which featured the work of artists such as Judy Baca, Senga Nengudi, Howardena Pindell, and Zarina. The New Museum of Contemporary Art in New York hosted Mendieta's first survey exhibition in 1987. Since her death, Mendieta has been recognized with international solo museum retrospectives such as Ana Mendieta, Art Institute of Chicago (2011) and Ana Mendieta in Context: Public and Private Work, De La Cruz Collection, Miami (2012).

In 2004, the Hirshhorn Museum and Sculpture Garden in Washington, D.C., organized Earth Body, Sculpture and Performance, a major retrospective that traveled to the Whitney Museum of American Art, New York; Des Moines Art Center, Iowa; and Pérez Art Museum Miami, Florida (2004).

In 2017, her work was presented in the retrospective solo show Ana Mendieta / Covered in Time and History at Bildmuseet, Umeå University, Sweden. In 2019, her work was displayed in the exhibition La Tierra Habla (The Earth Speaks) at Galerie Lelong, NYC, New York. In 2019-2020, her work was displayed in the exhibition Ana Mendieta: Source, at the Galleria Raffaella Cortese, Milan, Italy In 2020, her work was displayed in the exhibition Ana Mendieta: Blood Inside Outside at the Baltimore Museum of Art, in Baltimore, Maryland In November 4, 2022 – February 19, 2023, her work was displayed in the exhibition Ana Mendieta: Elemental at the Rochester Institute of Technology, City Art Space, in Rochester, NY Exhibition "En Búsqueda del Origen" 27 Jan 24 to 19 May 24 at Museo de Arte Contemporaneo, León, España (www.musac.es).

From 15 July 2026 – 17 January 2027, the Tate Modern will exhibit Ana Mendieta. The exhibition “is the first in-depth UK show of her work in over ten years, shines a light on Mendieta’s trailblazing practice, reinforcing her standing as one of the most important artists of the 20th century.”

On 18 November 2026, the Museum of Modern Art announced that it would mount Ana Mendieta: A Retrospective, the first retrospective of Mendieta's work in the United States. It will be on view from 12 December 2027 – 15 April 2028, and will be accompanied by a catalogue by Beverly Adams and Sophie Cavoulacos, Museum of Modern Art curators.

== Notable group exhibitions ==
In 2022, the Hammer Museum at University of California, Los Angeles, organized the exhibition Joan Didion: What She Means, curated by The New Yorker theater critic Hilton Als. The show traveled to the Pérez Art Museum Miami in 2023, and works by Ana Mendieta were included alongside artworks by 50 other contemporary international artists such as Félix González-Torres, Vija Celmins, Betye Saar, Maren Hassinger, Silke Otto-Knapp, John Koch, Ed Ruscha, Pat Steir, among others.

== Public collections (selection) ==
Mendieta's work is featured in many major public collections, including the Solomon R. Guggenheim Museum, Metropolitan Museum of Art, Whitney Museum of American Art, and Museum of Modern Art in New York; the Art Institute of Chicago; Centre Pompidou, Paris; Musée d'Art Moderne et Contemporain, Geneva; Tate Collection, London; the Nasher Sculpture Center, Dallas; and the Pérez Art Museum Miami.

== Death and controversy ==
Ana Mendieta died on September 8, 1985, in New York City, after falling from her 34th-floor apartment in Greenwich Village at 300 Mercer Street. She lived there with her husband of eight months, minimalist sculptor Carl Andre. The circumstances surrounding her death have been the subject of controversy. She fell 33 stories onto the roof of a deli. Just prior to her death, neighbors heard the couple arguing violently. The neighbors heard Mendieta scream out "no" repeatedly right before her death, and Andre had scratches all over his face. There were no eyewitnesses to the events that led up to Mendieta's death. A recording of Andre's 911 call showed him saying: "My wife is an artist, and I'm an artist, and we had a quarrel about the fact that I was more, eh, exposed to the public than she was. And she went to the bedroom, and I went after her, and she went out the window." Mendieta's friends said that she was afraid of heights and would not have gone near the window. During three years of legal proceedings, Andre's lawyer described Mendieta's death as a possible accident or a suicide. After a nonjury trial, Andre was acquitted of second-degree murder in February 1988.

The acquittal caused an uproar among Mendieta's fan base, including some feminists in the art world, and remains controversial. In 2010, a symposium called Where Is Ana Mendieta? was held at New York University to commemorate the 25th anniversary of her death. In May 2014, the feminist protest group No Wave Performance Task Force staged a protest in front of the Dia Art Foundation's retrospective on Carl Andre. The group deposited piles of animal blood and guts in front of the establishment, with protesters donning transparent tracksuits with "I Wish Ana Mendieta Was Still Alive" written on them. In March 2015, the No Wave Performance Task Force and a group of feminist poets from New York City traveled to Beacon, New York, to protest against the Andre retrospective at Dia Beacon, where they cried loudly in the main gallery, made siluetas in the snow on museum grounds, and stained the snow with paprika, sprinkles, and fake blood. In April 2017, protesters at an Andre retrospective handed out cards at the Geffen Contemporary museum with the statement: "Carl Andre is at MOCA Geffen. ¿Dónde está Ana Mendieta?" (Where is Ana Mendieta?). This was followed by an open letter to Museum of Contemporary Art (MOCA) Director Philippe Vergne protesting against the exhibit, from the group the Association of Hysteric Curators.

== Legacy ==
Following Mendieta's death in 1985, an outpouring of emotions from the art world sparked a feminist movement of many protests and art installations. Many people were not only angry but also feeling senses of sadness, desiderium, heartbreak, betrayal, confusion, grief and even determination to take action. This is where the variety of protests grew from. Some people chose to sit in Carl Andre's retrospective, staring at his art and simply start crying, others chose to spill chicken guts and blood onto the sidewalk in front of the building.

In 2009, Mendieta was awarded a Lifetime Achievement Award by the Cintas Foundation.

In 2010, she was the subject of Richard Move's controversial Where is Ana Mendieta? 25 Years Later - An Exhibition and Symposium, which included his film, BloodWork - The Ana Mendieta Story.

In 2018, The New York Times published a belated obituary for her that began, "Mendieta's art, sometimes violent, often unapologetically feminist and usually raw, left an indelible mark before her life was cut short."

In February 2024, it was announced that Academy Award nominee America Ferrera would star in and executive produce an Amazon Prime Video series about Mendieta. The work is based on a book by Robert Katz, to be scripted by Cherise Castro Smith and co-executive produced by Amazon MGM Studios and Plan B Entertainment.

The title character of Xochitl Gonzalez’s sophomore novel, Anita de Monte Laughs Last, is closely based on Mendieta, to whom the work is dedicated.

== See also ==
- Ecofeminist art
- Environmental art
- Feminist art movement in the United States
- Land art
- List of unsolved deaths
- Performance art
