= Conwill =

Conwill is a surname. Notable people with the surname include:

- Houston Conwill (1947–2016), American artist
- Kinshasha Holman Conwill (born 1951), American museum director
