= Brockman Gallery =

Art gallery in Los Angeles, California, US (1967–1970)

- Formation: 1967
- Founder: Alonzo Davis; Dale Brockman Davis
- Dissolved: 1990
- Headquarters: 4334 Degnan Avenue, Leimert Park, Los Angeles, California
- Location: United States
- Coordinates: 34.004956°N 118.331237°W

Brockman Gallery (1967 – 1990) of Leimert Park in Los Angeles, California, was the first major commercial art gallery run by Black artists, for Black artists. It was founded during the Black Arts Movement.

== History ==
Brockman Gallery was founded in 1967 by brothers Alonzo Davis, and Dale Brockman Davis. They named the gallery after their grandmother, Della Brockman.

The gallery provided exhibition space for artists in their early career including Dan Concholar, Maren Hassinger, David Hammons, Ulysses Jenkins, Senga Nengudi, John Outterbridge, Noah Purifoy, Betye Saar, and Charles W. White.

By the early 1970s, the brothers had transformed the gallery into a broader community art space and hosted a festival in Leimert Park. In 1973 the brothers founded a non-profit organization called Brockman Productions to support art in the Black community in Los Angeles.

== Legacy ==
For a brief period in the 1960s and 1970s in the United States, there was a period of major art galleries run by and for Black artists. Other notable Black-owned art galleries during this era include BlackMan's Art Gallery (1967–1974) of San Francisco, Gallery 32 (1968–1970) of Los Angeles, and Just Above Midtown (known as JAM Gallery; 1973–1989) of New York City.

In 2019, the Davis brothers donated the Brockman Gallery Archive to the Los Angeles Public Library.

The KCET television series Artbound featured a 2024 episode titled "Black Art: A Brockman Gallery Legacy" (season 15, episode 4).

The Lancaster Museum of Art and History in Lancaster, California held the exhibition, Act On It: Artists, Community and the Brockman Gallery in Los Angeles (2025).
