= Ulysses Jenkins =

American performance and video artist (1946–2026)

- Born: September 19, 1945; Los Angeles, California, U.S.
- Died: February 23, 2026 (aged 80)
- Known for: Video art

Ulysses Jenkins (September 19, 1946 – February 23, 2026) was an American visual artist, who used video-performance, music, and storytelling to examine questions of race, history, and power.

== Background ==
Born in Los Angeles on September 19, 1946, Ulysses Jenkins developed an interest in art during the 1960s while attending Hamilton High. He left Los Angeles in 1964 to attend Southern University in Baton Rouge, Louisiana, where he majored in painting and drawing and earned a Bachelor of Arts in 1969. Upon returning to Los Angeles, Jenkins began exhibiting his paintings at various venues and worked for the Los Angeles County Probation Department as a counselor for psychiatrically non-delinquent youth, providing art instruction as part of their treatment.

In 1972, Jenkins moved to Venice Beach and began painting murals after seeing the work of the Los Angeles Fine Arts Squad, which led him to create his first mural on the boardwalk at the corner of Rose Avenue and Ocean Front Walk. This work as a muralist, often a collaborative process and a public platform for social commentary, would become an essential aspect of his artistic career. During this time, Jenkins also became familiar with portable video recorders, interested in what this new art medium could achieve, he co-founded the media collective, Video Venice News where he documented happenings in Southern California resulting in his 1972–73 video, Remnants of the Watts Festival (compiled in 1980), a community festival commemorating the 1965 Watts Uprising. The tape is also a noteworthy examination of the U.S. government's covert surveillance of the African American community.

In 1975, Jenkins began working for the Brockman Gallery's Street Graphics on Crenshaw Boulevard and the Social & Public Art Resource Center in the San Fernando Valley. During this time, he also returned to mural painting, notably contributing to the Great Wall of Los Angeles. This half-mile-long mural, which told the story of California's diverse peoples' trials and tribulations, was organized by the renowned muralist Judy Baca and is located in the Tujunga Wash flood-control channel.

Jenkins enrolled at the Otis Art Institute in 1977, where he studied video and received a Master of Fine Arts (MFA) in 1979. His video debut, Mass of Images (1977), used performance art to examine the destructive impact of racist imagery in the United States. While at Otis, Jenkins found influential mentors, particularly Charles White, who significantly supported and encouraged Jenkins and his generation of other young African-American artists they included Kerry James Marshall, David Hammons, Maren Hassinger, and Senga Nengudi who often collaborated and established an informal collective, Studio Z, that occasionally gathered at David Hammons' studio for "spontaneous actions."

During the 1980s, Jenkins worked with the Electronic Café, a grassroots arts group pioneering collaborative telecommunications. The group connected communities using interactive video, audio, and shared screens, accomplishing this decades before Skype and Zoom. In 1989, Jenkins moved to Oakland, where he taught video production to youth in San Francisco’s gang-intervention program. While maintaining ties to Southern California, he arranged tele-video poetry readings between Oakland and the Electronic Café in Santa Monica.

Jenkins taught at several institutions, including Cal State Dominguez Hills, the Otis College of Art and Design, and UC San Diego. In 1993, he joined the University of California, Irvine (UCI) as professor of Art (Video, Digital, Performance) with an affiliate role in African American Studies. He retired from UCI in 2022, with the title of Professor Emeritus in the Department of Art.

Jenkins died on February 23, 2026, at the age of 79.

== Career ==
Early on, Jenkins recognized how white culture dominated the airwaves and reinforced negative representations of African Americans. In spite of these portrayals, Jenkins saw the potential of the visual medium to reshape the conversation by enabling individuals to share their own stories. In his videos, he assumed both the role of a witness and that of a subject, thereby enabling him to reframe negative portrayals of Black people in mass media. Film, television, and the news had all propagated stereotypes and caricatures with willful disregard. Jenkins realized that visual technologies could provide diverse representations and foster community building, especially in the contemporary, media-centric world.

Adopting the African tradition of the Griot—one who uses storytelling, poetry, and song to recount their community’s history—Jenkins became the "video griot". Through video, performance, music, poetry, and visual effects, he recited stories of Black America, merging narrative traditions with new media to spotlight contemporary experiences.

The concept of "doggerel", meaning comic verse in irregular rhythm, is key to the artist's work. In his 1979 video, Two-Zone Transfer, Jenkins and his fellow Otis students—Kerry James Marshall, Ronnie Nichols, and Greg Pitts—employ doggerel in comedic verse and unusual rhythms. They incorporate a fog machine into a fever-dreamlike setting. Minstrels who wear masks of Richard Nixon and Gerald Ford satirically convey the development of African American stereotypes in the American entertainment industry. The video/performance concludes with Jenkins as James Brown, accompanied by the squeals and screams of his fans. Through these elements, the dreamer (Jenkins) awakens to explore his own Black identity and to convey, through introspection convey the complex racial politics of America. A year later, Jenkins fully embraced the concept of "doggerel," integrating it into his work through innovative video editing and shooting techniques. His 1980 video, Inconsequential Doggereal, uses fragmented timing and narrative, resulting in an awkwardness that shifts the focus from the story—which possesses a politically humorous, surreal quality—to the video's process. Jenkins's artistic interest lies in the evolving nature of viewer interpretation, particularly in how an audience's understanding of events and the issues they present develops over time.

In 2021, the retrospective exhibition Ulysses Jenkins: Without Your Interpretation was held at the Institute of Contemporary Art, Philadelphia. It traveled to the Hammer Museum at UCLA. Jenkins's work was included in the 2025 exhibition Photography and the Black Arts Movement, 1955–1985 at the National Gallery of Art.

His work is in the collection of the Whitney Museum of American Art.

=== Awards and honors ===
Ulysses Jenkins was recognized multiple times for his work, including three individual artist fellowships from the National Endowment for the Arts. He received the California Arts Council's Multicultural Entry Grant to support his role as artistic director of the interdisciplinary media arts production group, Othervisions Studio. Additionally, the Black Filmmakers Hall of Fame honored him with the first-place award in the experimental video category in both 1990 and 1992.

== Noted video works ==
- Mass of Images (1978): One of the first experimental video works by a Black American artist, it critiques the destructive power of racist media stereotypes.
- Two-Zone Transfer (1979): A piece examining Black performance and identity.
- King David (1978-79): A documentary-style video featuring artist David Hammons
- Remnants of the Watts Festival (1972–73, compiled 1980): A documentary recording of the historic community festival.
- Inconsequential Doggereal (1981): A color video work involving performance and media critique.
- Dream City (1983): A five-minute HD video exploring urban environments.
- Cake Walk (1983)
- Without Your Interpretation (1984): A major work that also serves as the title for his Hammer retrospective.
- Peace and Anwar Sadat (1986): A tribute to the peace activism of Anwar Sadat.
- The Video Griots Trilogy: Includes Self Divination (1989), Mutual Native Duplex (1990), and The Nomadics.
- Ethnic Cleansing (2022): A music video about Russia’s invasion of Ukraine by Jenkins and his band Othervisions.
