= Kinshasha Holman Conwill =

American museum director and author

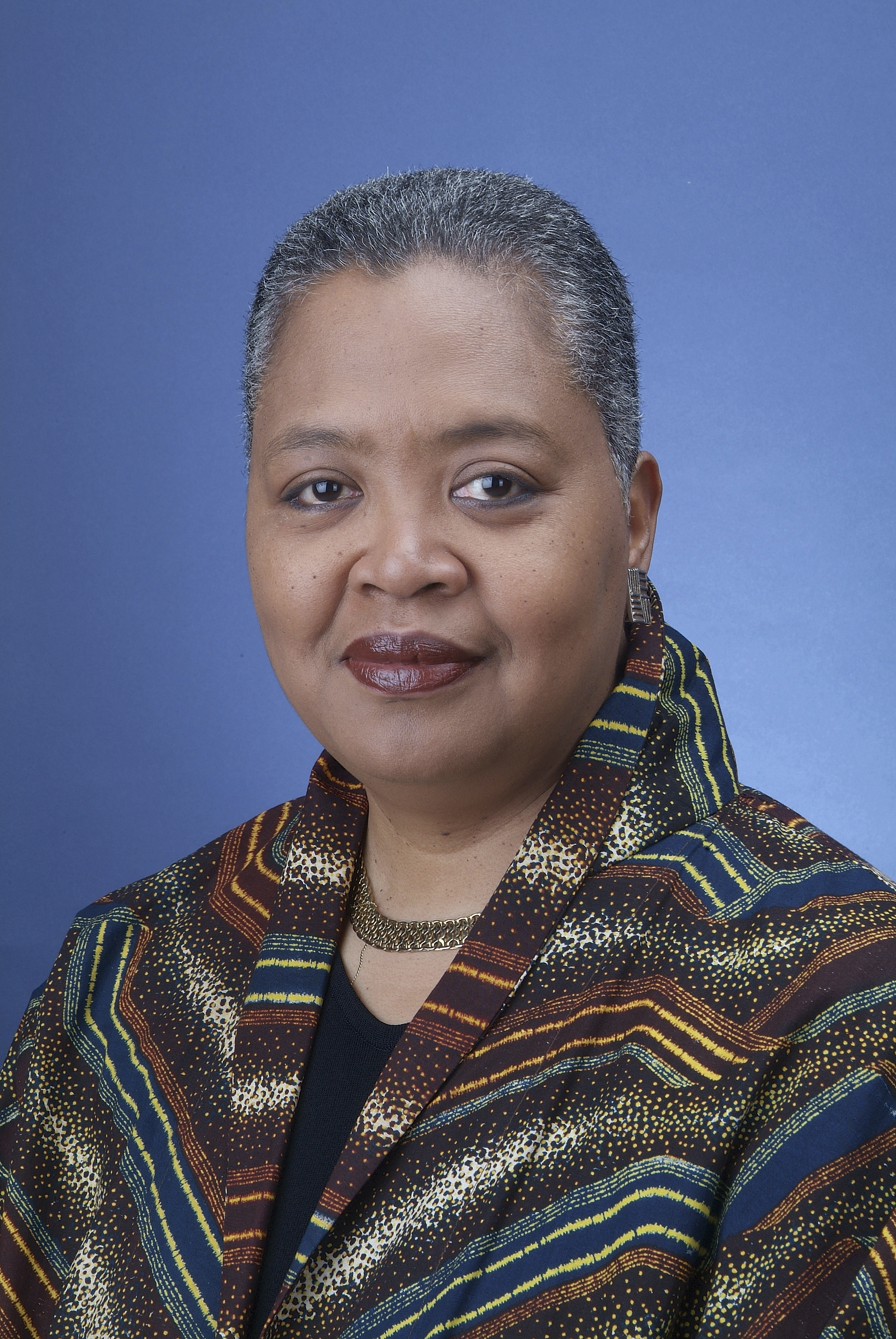
- Conwill in 2006
- Born: Karen Holman; 11 April 1951; Atlanta (United States)
- Education: Mount Holyoke College, Howard University, University of California, Los Angeles
- Occupations: Board member, writer
- Employers: Hollyhock House; National Museum of African American History and Culture (2005–2022); National Museum of the American Indian; Studio Museum in Harlem (1980–1999)
- Notable work: Ain't Nothing Like the Real Thing: How the Apollo Theater Shaped American Entertainment
- Spouse: Houston Conwill
- Father: M. Carl Holman

Kinshasha Holman Conwill (born April 11, 1951) is an American museum director, arts and management consultant, author, and serves as a board member for numerous organizations within the US-American cultural sector.

== Early life and education ==
Kinshasha Holman Conwill was born on April 11, 1951, in Atlanta. Her parents were Mariella Ukina Ama Holman and Moses Carl Holman, the latter an editor, author, and central figure in the civil rights movement. She graduated from Mount Holyoke College in South Hadley, Massachusetts, as a National Achievement Scholar.

She studied at Howard University in Washington, D.C., and received her B.F.A. in 1973. In 1980, she graduated from the University of California, Los Angeles with a M.B.A. degree.

== Career ==
During her studies in Los Angeles, Conwill worked as an arts educator and activities coordinator for the Hollyhock House. After her graduation in 1980, she became the Deputy Director at the Studio Museum in Harlem and subsequently served as Director from 1988 until 1999. Conwill described her time at the museum and the meaning of the institution for the Black community at the occasion of their 50th anniversary:

The Museum was everything. It was a community center, an artists’ circle, a forum for amazing conversations and intellectual discussions, a meeting ground, a vibrant place that had a lot of owners. I think this has stayed true for the Museum. I saw it as a center of life not just in Harlem, but also of New York, and, in some ways, the center of a much larger black world and art world.

— Kinshasha Holman Conwill, in Elizabeth Gwinn, "A Legacy of Leadership: Kinshasha Holman Conwill", Studio Magazine

During her time as the museum's director, they collaborated with artists such as Elizabeth Catlett, Miles Davis, Maren Hassinger, Luis Jiménez, Glenn Ligon, James Luna, Andres Serrano, James VanDerZee, and David Wojnarowicz. Furthermore, she conceptualized, organized, or co-organized more than 40 major exhibitions for the Studio Museum, some of which also travelled across the country.

Between 1999 and 2005, Conwill worked in several positions within New York's cultural sector, among others at the American Association of Museums, the New York City Creative Communities program, the National Museum of the American Indian, the New York Foundation for the Arts, as well as the New York City Arts Coalition.

In 2005, she was appointed as deputy director of the National Museum of African American History and Culture in Washington D.C. Her role included fundraising, external partnerships, expanding the museum's collections, and developing exhibitions and programming. She also acted as editor, author and co-author for several of the institution's publications. In 2022 Conwill announced her retirement from the museum, transitioning to the role of Deputy Director Emerita.

Conwill has also acted as a board member for major arts and cultural organizations, such as the Provisions Library in Washington, D.C., the Andy Warhol Foundation for the Visual Arts, the Municipal Art Society, and the Rockefeller Foundation.

== Personal life ==
From 1971 until his death in 2016, Conwill was married to the artist Houston Conwill.
