= Charles W. White =

American painter (1918–1979)

Charles White
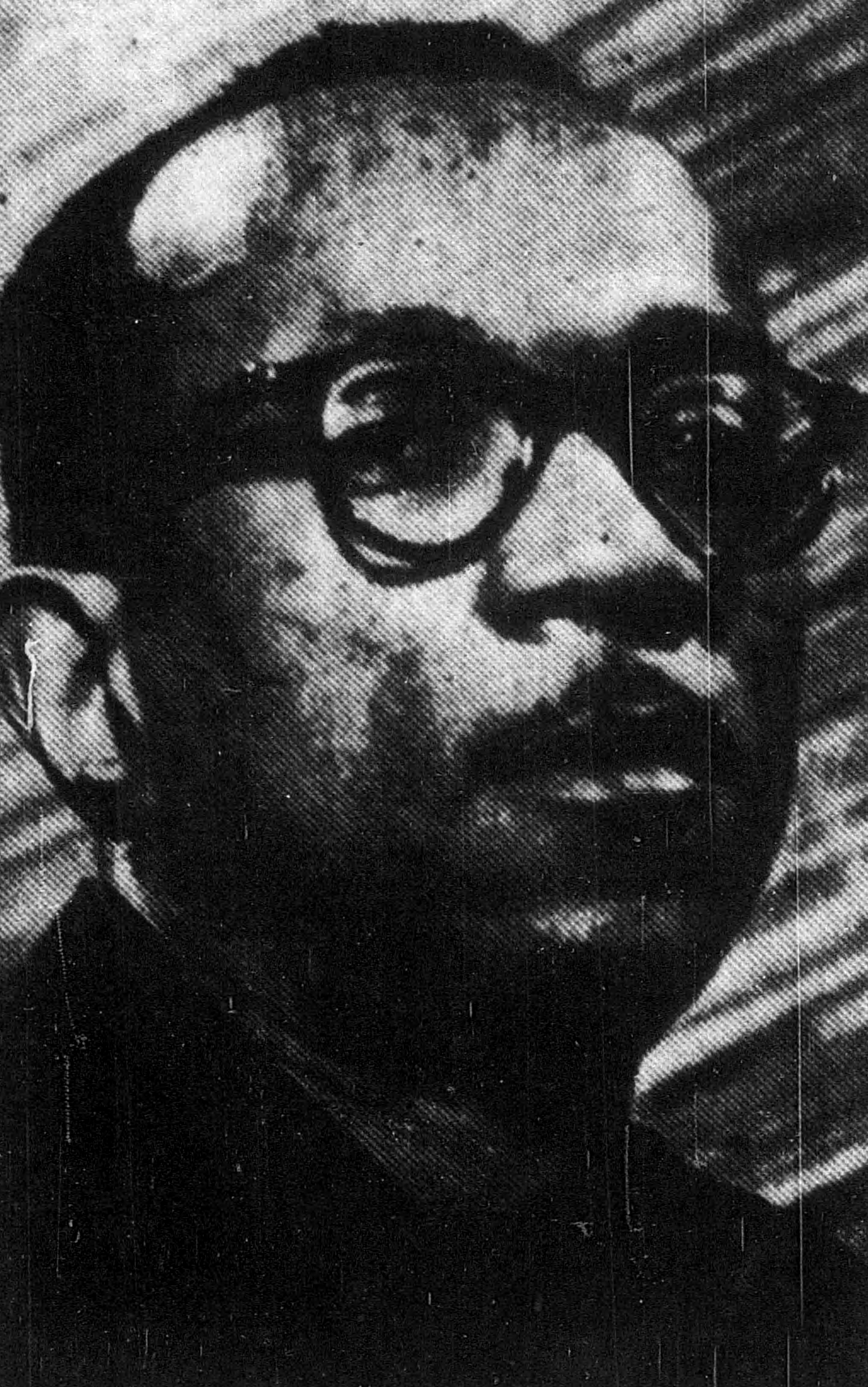
- White c. 1950
- Born: Charles Wilbert White, Jr. April 2, 1918; Chicago, Illinois, US
- Died: October 3, 1979 (aged 61); Los Angeles, California, US
- Education: School of the Art Institute of Chicago
- Known for: Painting; visual art
- Notable work: The Contribution of the Negro to American Democracy
- Movement: New Negro Movement (Chicago Black Renaissance)
- Spouse(s): Elizabeth Catlett (m. 1941-1946; divorced); Frances Barrett (m. 1950-1979; his death)

Charles Wilbert White Jr. (April 2, 1918 – October 3, 1979) was a prominent American Social Realist in the visual arts who emerged from Chicago’s Black Renaissance of the 1930s. He worked in painting, drawing, lithography, and murals to chronicle the African American experience, including its struggles and triumphs, through representational art. His lifelong commitment to using his art to defend Black dignity, humanity, and freedom solidified his place as one of the most well-known artists in African American art history. He was elected to the National Academy of Design in 1972.

Following his death in 1979, White's work has been included in the permanent collections of the Art Institute of Chicago, Los Angeles County Museum of Art, The Metropolitan Museum of Art, the Whitney Museum of American Art, the National Gallery of Art, The Newark Museum, the Nelson-Atkins Museum of Art, and the Santa Barbara Museum of Art. White's best known work is The Contribution of the Negro to American Democracy, a mural at Hampton University. In 2018, the centenary year of his birth, the first major retrospective exhibition of his work was organized by the Art Institute of Chicago and the Museum of Modern Art.

== Early life and education ==
Charles Wilbert White was born on April 2, 1918, to Ethelene Gary, a domestic worker, and Charles White Sr., a railroad and construction worker, on the South Side of Chicago. Ethelene was born in Mississippi and came north in the Great Migration. She raised Charles, and as she had no child care, she would often leave him at the public library. There, White developed an affinity for art and reading. White's mother bought him a set of oil paints when he was seven years old, which hooked White on painting. White also played music as a child, studied modern dance, and was part of theater groups; however, he stated that art was his true passion.

White's mother also took him to the Art Institute of Chicago, where he would read and look at paintings, developing a particular interest in the works of Winslow Homer and George Inness. Since White had little money growing up, he often painted on whatever surfaces he could find including shirts, cardboard, and window blinds. During the Great Depression, White tried to conceal his passion out of embarrassment; however, this ended when White got a job painting signs at the age of fourteen. White learned how to mix paints by sitting in every day for a week in an Art Institute-sponsored painting class that was taking place at a park near his home. His mother remarried when White's father died in 1926. She married a steel mill worker who would become an abusive alcoholic, especially toward White. This experience led him to escape into art. White had few opportunities for pursuing his natural talent at that time both because of the abuse and because there was little money for it. His mother began sending him to Mississippi twice a year to his aunts, Hasty and Harriet Baines, where he would learn about his heritage and African-American Southern folklore. He drew upon his own experiences, curiosity, and feelings about the neglected history of African Americans to help shape his work. An early activist, as a teenager he volunteered his talents and became the house artist at the National Negro Congress in Chicago. Later, in a union with fellow black artists, White was arrested while picketing.

White won a grant during the seventh grade to attend Saturday art classes at the Art Institute of Chicago. After reading Alain Locke's book The New Negro: An Interpretation White's social views changed. He learned about important African American figures in American history and began asking his teachers why they were not taught in school, causing him to be labeled a "rebel problematic child." White did not graduate from high school, having lost a year due to his refusal to attend class after being disillusioned with the system. While he was encouraged by his art teachers to submit his artworks and won various scholarships, each award would later be declared an "error," taken away from him, and given to a white person instead. He was admitted to two art schools, but each one then pulled his acceptance because of his race.

White ultimately received a full scholarship to attend the School of the Art Institute of Chicago (SAIC), where he studied from 1937 to 1938. While there, White identified Mitchell Siporin, Francis Chapin, and Aaron Bohrod as his influences. He was an excellent draftsman, completing five drawing courses and earning final A grades. To pay the costs of art supplies, White became a cook, using his mother's instruction and recipes. White later became an art teacher at St. Elizabeth Catholic High School.

== Artistic practice ==
Charles White's art chronicled the African American experience through paintings, drawings, and prints that elevated both legendary historical leaders and ordinary working-class Black people into majestic figures. Although rooted in the Black community, White considered himself a humanist. He operated from the core premise that humanity is fundamentally good, and he designed his work to bridge divides and heal the wounds of injustice and ethnic exclusion, bringing all people together. Deeply committed to a representational, figurative style at a time when the mainstream art world heavily favored abstraction. He used clear, graphic images to illuminate contemporary injustices and those of the past, and famously depicted legendary freedom fighters and leaders such as Harriet Tubman, Sojourner Truth, Frederick Douglass, and Nat Turner. White believed artists had a duty to actively participate in social justice and that their art must ally itself with the forces of liberation; it could not simply mirror society, but had to shape it actively, stating, "Paint is the only weapon I have with which to fight what I resent."

Five Great American Negroes, 1939–1940, 60-inch by 155-inch, oil on canvas,

After graduating from SAIC in 1938, the 21-year-old White had his first solo show at Paragon Studios in Chicago, Illinois. That same year, he also created his first major work, which would set the future direction of his art career, when the Illinois Art Project, a state affiliate of the Works Progress Administration hired him to paint a mural for the George Cleveland Branch of the Chicago Public Library. White composed a 60-inch by 155-inch oil painting on canvas titled Five Great American Negroes, it celebrates Black history, resilience, and achievement by honoring five pivotal African American pioneers: Sojourner Truth, Booker T. Washington, Frederick Douglass, George Washington Carver, and Marian Anderson. Five Great American Negroes is currently located in the reading room of the Vernon E. Jordan, Jr., Esq. Law Library at Howard University School of Law in Washington, D.C. The following year, he received a commission from the Associated Negro Press (ANP) to create another mural for the 1940 Exhibition of the Art of the American Negro at the Chicago Coliseum, part of the American Negro Exposition commemorating the 75th anniversary of the Thirteenth Amendment, which ended slavery. White created a 20-by-19-foot oil on canvas titled A History of the Negro Press. White was also included in the Exposition’s art show, Exhibition of the Art of the American Negro, 1851 to 1940, which showed selection of his works on paper, including his award-winning drawing, There Were No Crops. During this time, White was recognized as an important figure in the Chicago Black Renaissance cultural movement and taught art classes at the Southside Community Art Center.

In 1941, White moved to New Orleans to teach at Dillard University. That same year, he married sculptor and printmaker Elizabeth Catlett, who also taught at Dillard. In 1942, White received the Julius Rosenwald Fellowship, and it was possible for him and Catlett to move to New York City where he joined other influential African American artists and intellectuals, such as Jacob Lawrence, Langston Hughes, Richard Wright, and W. E. B. DuBois. He also began studies at the Arts Student League, where he learned lithography and etching techniques, taking direction from renowned artist Harry Sternberg, who encouraged him to move beyond “stylization to individuation in his figures.” There, White honed his technical skills and developed a deeper vision of Black society.

While in New York, White and Catlett met Viktor Lowenfeld, a Jewish refugee from Nazi Germany who taught at the then-Hampton Institute (now Hampton University) in Virginia and invited the couple to join the faculty. In 1943, White and Catlett began teaching at the Hampton Institute, a historically Black college. During his tenure at Hampton, White selected an interior wall of Wainwright Auditorium as the location for his mural, The Contribution of the Negro to American Democracy. He executed the work in egg tempera, measuring 12 by 17 feet, and it depicts several iconic and influential African Americans, including Denmark Vesey, Nat Turner, Peter Salem, George Washington Carver, Harriet Tubman, Frederick Douglass, and Marian Anderson. In a 1965 interview with the Smithsonian’s Archives of American Art, White articulated his intentions: “The object was to take the contributions (of African Americans) both through physical revolt of fighting for the abolition of slavery, and also the contributions that had been made in the sciences as well as in the arts, and politics. So, to cover the contributions (of African Americans) to the many facets of American life was the key to this whole struggle.”

In 1943, White returned to New York and began teaching at the George Washington Carver School in Harlem. His teaching was interrupted when he was drafted into the U.S. Army as a corporal in the all-Black 132^{nd} Engineering Regiment. After contracting tuberculosis while assisting in abate flooding on the Mississippi River, which compromised his health for the rest of his life and limited his ability to work in oil paint, he was honorably discharged.

In 1946, Catlett received a Rosenwald Fund Fellowship, enabling her and White to study in Mexico City, where they joined the influential print shop collective Taller de Gráfica Popular, known for using art to promote revolutionary social causes. During their stay, they resided with David Alfaro Siqueiros and were introduced to Diego Rivera, José Clemente Orozco, and Pablo O'Higgins. Shortly after returning to New York from Mexico in 1947, the couple divorced.

Our War, 1949. lithograph, image: 7 x 9 in. © The Charles White Archives.

Printmaking enabled White to reach a wider public more directly and allowed him to bring together his social commitment and artistic practice. Although he had long been aware of art's social utility, with his lithographs and linocuts he was finally able to communicate with a large, cross-national community of black workers and socialist artists, as opposed to his paintings, which were generally tied to individual purchasers. He started providing political cartoons for the leftist and workers' rights publication Daily Worker primarily during the 1940s and early 1950 as he sought to prominent the struggle for Black racial equality with the labor movement. White participated in the 1949 Workshop of Graphic Art in New York City with his offset lithograph Our War, which portrays a group of African American men navigating a dark street at night, led by an air raid warden holding a flashlight, and published it in Negro: U.S.A. A Graphic History of the Negro People in America Workshop Prints No. 2, a portfolio of 26 social realist prints published to coincide with National Negro History Week, February 6th through 12th, 1949. White, together with Leonard Baskin, Roy DeCarava, Antonio Frasconi, Robert Gwathmey, J. B. Handelsman, Charles Keller, Louise Kruger, Jacob Landau, Al Lass, Jacob Lawrence, Jerry Martin, Leona Pierce, Jim Schlecker, and Edward Walsh, produced these works to highlight African American history, enslavement, resistance, and democratic struggles. In 1953, he published, in association with Masses and Mainstream, a portfolio of six reproductions of his ink-and-charcoal drawings, entitled Charles White: Six Drawings. Priced at $3—about $35.23 in 2024—this portfolio aimed at getting art to the people, a main concern for progressive artists of the period. In this respect it was a great success, and White himself acknowledged this when he learned that a group of workers in Alabama combined their savings to buy a portfolio and shared the pictures among themselves.

In 1950, a period when interracial marriage was illegal in many states, White remarried a white woman, Frances Barrett, a social worker. A year later, the couple traveled to Europe, where White discovered that the European art community held his work in high regard. Upon returning to New York, White was summoned to appear before the House Un-American Activities Committee because he had visited Eastern Europe and the U.S.S.R., as well as because of his long-standing involvement with workers' rights organizations in the United States and his contributions to leftist publications such as the Daily Worker. Although his summons was later revoked, White subsequently learned that the FBI had been monitoring his activities for an extended period.

In 1956, due to ongoing respiratory issues—potentially related to an earlier case of tuberculosis—White moved to Los Angeles for its drier, more mild climate. From 1965 to his death in 1979, White taught at the Otis Art Institute in Los Angeles. On faculty at Otis, he was a beacon for African American artists who came to study with him. Among those he taught were Alonzo Davis, David Hammons, and Kerry James Marshall. Eloy Torrez also studied under him, and considers him his greatest influence. White was elected to the National Academy of Design in 1972. Later in life, White moved to Altadena, California, where he remained until his death of congestive heart failure in 1979. A park near where he lived in Altadena is named for him.

White's work has been exhibited widely throughout the United States, including, among many others, exhibitions at the Roko Gallery, the Boston Museum of Fine Arts, and the Whitney Museum of American Art. In 1939 he produced his WPA mural Five Great American Negroes, now at Howard University Gallery of Art. White also showed at the Palace of Culture in Warsaw and the Pushkin Museum. In 1976 his work was featured in Two Centuries of Black American Art, LACMA's first exhibition devoted exclusively to African-American Artists.

== Legacy ==
During his time at the Otis Art Institute, White was a mentor for many young Black artists, including Kerry James Marshall, Richard Wyatt Jr., David Hammons, Ulysses Jenkins, and Alonzo Davis. Marshall reflected that “Under [his] influence I always knew that I wanted to make work that was about something: history, culture, politics, social issues. (...) It was just a matter of mastering the skills to actually do it.” He also inspired a generation of socially conscious African American artists like Benny Andrews, Faith Ringgold, and Dana Chandler and regularly attended exhibitions in Black art spaces like the Brockman Gallery, Gallery 32 and the Heritage Gallery.

White's popularity faded after his death. According to M.H. Miller, “Part of this had to do with the fact that throughout the ’80s and ’90s, artists of color were rare in an industry that endorses the work of white men at the exclusion of everyone else.” Additionally, “during his lifetime and in the decades following, the figurative art that White championed was overshadowed by a more abstract or conceptual style.”

Shortly after White's death, a park in Altadena, California, where he spent a great deal of his later years, was renamed Charles White Park—the first park to be named after an American-born artist. The park hosted the Charles White Memorial Arts Festival from 1980 through to the early 1990s, and, in 2021, Altadena Arts hosted the first-ever Altadena Arts Festival, a reiteration of the Charles White Memorial Art Festival focused on celebrating artists of color, women artists, and artists with disabilities.

In 2004 the Charles White Elementary School & Visual Arts Magnet was established on the former Otis College campus where he taught for 14 years.

White's works and writings are featured in the collections of Atlanta University, the Barnett-Aden Gallery, Howard University, the Library of Congress, the Metropolitan Museum of Art, the Minneapolis Institute of Art, the Oakland Museum, the Smithsonian American Art Museum, the Nelson-Atkins Museum of Art, Syracuse University and the Virginia Museum of Fine Arts. The CEJJES Institute of Pomona, New York, owns a number of White's works and has established a dedicated Charles W. White Gallery. In 2015, Drs. Susan G. and Edmund Gordon of Pomona, New York donated their collection of works by Charles White to the Blanton Museum of Art at the University of Texas, Austin.

== Reception ==
In 1982, a retrospective exhibition of White's work was held at the Studio Museum in Harlem. In the 1990s, the idea of staging a major traveling retrospective exhibition arose. Ultimately, over approximately a ten-year period, staff from the Art Institute of Chicago and the Museum of Modern Art attempted to locate various White pieces to put together an extensive exhibition of his work. The exhibition opened in Chicago in 2018, traveling to New York City and Los Angeles.

White "was a humanist, drawn to the physical body and more literal representations of the lives of African-Americans," according to Lauren Warnecke for the Chicago Tribune. While this put him out of step with the abstract movement in art, the power of his work is undeniable according to the Los Angeles Times' Christopher Knight, especially White's graphic work in graphite, charcoal, crayon and ink. The Washington Post art critic, Philip Kennicott finds White's work central to American art. "Grace, passion, coolness, toughness, [and] beauty" mark White's work, according to Holland Cotter in The New York Times; White had "the hand of an angel" and "the eye of a sage."

In November 2019, two works by White went up for the first time in Christie's and Sotheby's main-seasonal New York City contemporary art auctions. Both works, Banner for Willie J. (1976)—a portrait of White's cousin, who was killed during an armed robbery—and Ye Shall Inherit the Earth (1953)—a charcoal drawing of civil rights icon Rosa Lee Ingram with a child in her arms—made sales records for the artist's work.
