= Carey Jenkins =

American architect

Carey K. Jenkins (died 1987) was an American architect active in the Los Angeles area in the mid-20th century. He was one of few black graduate of the University of Southern California (USC) School of Architecture. After graduating from USC in 1943, he served in the Army Air Force. He worked for A. Quincy Jones in the late 1940s.

Jenkins was known to be "politically well-connected." The Los Angeles Tribune commented: "James Garrott, Paul R. Williams, and Carey Jenkins, are the only Negro architects ever to get a public contract in this slate ... and except for Williams they get them infrequently."

His offices were located in Beverly Hills in the late 1960s and early 1970s.

Jenkins partnered with Charles E. Fleming to complete the Martin Luther King, Jr. General Hospital in the Watts neighborhood in 1972. In the late 1970s, Jenkins-Fleming, Inc. had offices in six U.S. cities and in West Africa, and Jenkins was chairman of the board.

Jenkins had three children, among them the notable post minimalist artist Maren Hassinger (born in 1947 as Maren Louise Jenkins).

== Buildings ==
- Bank of America branch, 4073 W. Washington Blvd., Los Angeles
- Martin Luther King, Jr. General Hospital, 1680 E. 120th St., Los Angeles
- Augustus Hawkins Psychiatric Center, 1720 E. 120th St., Los Angeles
- Hubert Humphrey Comprehensive Health Center, Slauson Ave. & Main St., Los Angeles
- Independent Square senior housing, 2455 S. St. Andrews Place, Los Angeles
- (with Honnold & Rex) Mary McLeod Bethune Junior High School, Los Angeles

== See also ==
- List of American architects
