= Maren Hassinger =

African-American artist, educator (born 1947)

- Born: Maren Louise Jenkins; 1947 (age 78–79); Los Angeles, California, U.S.
- Spouse: Peter Hassinger

Maren Hassinger (born Maren Louise Jenkins in 1947) is an African-American artist and educator whose career spans four decades. Hassinger uses sculpture, film, dance, performance art, and public art to explore the relationship between the natural world and industrial materials. She incorporates everyday materials in her art, like wire rope, plastic bags, branches, dirt, newspaper, garbage, leaves, and cardboard boxes. Hassinger has stated that her work "focuses on elements, or even problems—social and environmental—that we all share, and in which we all have a stake. … I want it to be a humane and humanistic statement about our future together." Trained in dance, Hassinger transitioned to making sculpture and visual art in college. Hassinger received her MFA in Fiber Arts from UCLA in 1973. She was the director emeritus of the Rinehart School of Sculpture at the Maryland Institute College of Art for ten years. She currently lives and works in New York City.

== Early life ==
In 1947, Maren Louise Jenkins was born in Los Angeles, California, to Helen Mills Jenkins, a police officer and educator, and Carey Jenkins, an architect. At an early age, she showed a gift for art and was exposed to both her mother's interest in flower arranging and her father's work at his drafting table.

== Education ==
In 1965, she enrolled at Bennington College. After being rejected for their dance program, she studied sculpture with the help of Issac Witkin, as well as drawing with Pat Adams. Hassinger graduated with a Bachelor of Arts in sculpture in 1969. Because she originally intended to study dance at Bennington she, instead, sought to incorporate aspects of dance into her sculptures.

During Hassinger's years at Bennington College, the institution was an all-women's college, prominently white with mostly men serving as instructors, many of whom had New York gallery affiliations. Hassinger believed the institutional connections and affiliations of the instructors were distant from the experiences of many students, and she rejected the formal strategies that were being taught. In an essay on Hassinger's practice, Maureen Megerian wrote:

". . . Clement Greenberg's formalist approach dominated the art department, so instructors focused on the creation of abstract, Constructivist-inspired welded steel sculpture. Minimalism, then predominant in the New York art world, presented another model of formulaic, abstract art for students to follow. [Hassinger] ultimately rejected such strict formal strategies, although the discipline of these methods, especially such Minimalist devices as repetition and regular arrangement, provides her work with a rational underpinning that she consciously complicates and makes more emotionally engaging."

In 1969, she moved to New York City to enroll in drafting courses and concurrently work as an art editor at a publishing company. As an editor, she managed the inclusion of African-American images in textbooks, "...a position she has described as 'demeaning.'" She married writer Peter Hassinger and returned to Los Angeles with her husband in 1970.

She earned a Master of Fine Arts in fiber from UCLA in 1973.

== Arts career and influences ==
Maren Hassinger started her artistic experimentation while a graduate student at UCLA in the early 1970s, in a Los Angeles junkyard where she came across bulks of industrial wire rope. She found that the material could be used sculpturally and as a fiber that could be manipulated to resemble plant life. This became a signature medium for her. It was also during this period that Hassinger began to collaborate with the sculptor Senga Nengudi. The two artists' friendship developed when they were both working as CETA artists administered by Brockman Gallery. This federally funded program enabled Hassinger to create Twelve Trees #2 in 1979.

Hassinger was part of Los Angeles art collective Studio Z which included Nengudi, David Hammons, Ronn Davis, Duval Lewis, RoHo, Franklin Parker, Barbara McCullough, Houston Conwill, and Joe Ray (artist).

Southern fiction writer Walker Percy influenced her childhood connection between the natural and the manufactured world with his work, Wreath. Many of Percy's novels, which Hassinger was reading at the time, are about navigating a modern world that was becoming removed from nature. Another influence which struck her was the sculpture work of Eva Hesse. During an exhibition at the Pasadena Art Museum in 1973, Hassinger was introduced to Hesse's work and admired her obsessive exploration of forms and techniques, and ability to convey emotion through fiber methods. Hassinger recalled:

"It was as if I was looking at somebody's spirit made manifest. . . it was an absolute gut level, wrenching experience. . . as if the sculpture were made flesh. . . later when I began to read about [Eva Hesse], it was as if she had managed somehow to put all the emotional truth of her life into that piece, and it communicated that way. . . It was a total true expression of life."

== Dance and performance art ==
Hassinger practiced and trained in dance since the time she was just five years old and hoped to pursue a career involving dance. After being turned away from the dance major at Bennington, Hassinger alternatively decided to study fine arts, specifically sculpture, all the while incorporating her love for dance into her work through performance art and her eventual collaboration with Senga Nengudi. Their friendship sparked a shared interest in dance, sculpture, and art through performance. Together they produced Get Up, R.S.V.P. Performance Piece, and many other works.

Incorporating both sculptural and performance work, Hassinger and Nengudi's collaborative sculptures have been considered ahead of their time due to their process of "combin[ing] sculpture, dance, theater, music and more with the collaborative spirit of community meetings and the avant-garde brio of Allan Kaprow's happenings." Additionally, Hassinger utilizes movements of everyday life in her dance.

Hassinger wrote a "Manifesto" about her work with Nengudi in 2006, to which Nengudi wrote the response "Maren and Me" in 2009, both essays expressing their solidarity, mutual artistic inspiration and love for each other. Hassinger's love of dance continued throughout her life and has shaped how she understands and makes art. While few of their works from the 1970s remain, Hassinger and Nengudi continue to collaborate, with Hassinger activating Nengudi's sculpture R.S.V.P.X as recently as 2014.

In a discussion with art critic Kellie Jones, Hassenger has said this about her performance work: "I don't see art performance as a form you necessarily have to entertain an audience or feel compelled to make them laugh or cry or clap their hands, because what it is really about is communication.... It's like having your art thoughts and sticking them on the body and having your body move around. It's absolutely an extension of those art thoughts"

== Film ==
Through moving videos, Hassinger has explored personal family interactions and her own family history to tackle themes of identity. Her daughter, Ava Hassinger, is also an artist. The two have produced a video in which they perform improvisational choreography together under the title "Matriarch." In 2004, Daily Mask, which is a 16mm film transferred to video, was made. It depicts Hassinger acting out her personal story and references back to an African past through associations to sculpture, art/cultural history, and feminist issues.

== Themes ==
Hassinger's work has been described as "ecological," but Hassinger herself does not see her work as such. Rather, she aims to produce humanistic statements about society and its commonalities. She unveils how meaningless cultural stereotyping is due to the way it establishes racial and social barriers and buries away the similarities and parallels that exists between people. Moreover, Hassinger remains adamant on having contemporaneous conversations in regards to race and gender. Additionally, Hassinger has addressed issues of equality with works like Love, a display made of hundreds of pink plastic bags, each containing a love note. Such pieces exemplify how she is able to evoke beauty and themes about society using everyday, common materials.

== Mid-life ==
From 1984-1985, Hassinger worked at the Studio Museum in Harlem as an artist-in-residence.

During the 1980s, the League of Allied Arts sponsored the musical Ain't Misbehavin honoring various Black artists. The League of Allied Arts is the longest-running Black women's arts nonprofit arts organization in the Los Angeles area. The musical took place at the Aquarius Theatre in Hollywood, and Hassinger was among the several honored artists.

From 1997 until 2017, she was the Director of the Rinehart School of Sculpture at the Maryland Institute College of Art. Hassinger was an adjunct professor at Stony Brook University for five years.

== Collections ==
Hassinger has work held in the permanent collections of Hammer Museum, Los Angeles, CA; Reginald F. Lewis Museum of Maryland African American History and Culture, Baltimore, MD; California African American Museum, Los Angeles, CA; Portland Museum of Art, Portland, OR; The Studio Museum in Harlem, New York, NY; Williams College Art Museum, Williamstown, MA; San Francisco Museum of Modern Art, San Francisco, CA; the Museum of Modern Art, New York, NY.

== Works ==
- Untitled (Sea Anemone), 1971
- Untitled, 1972/ 2020
- Tree Duet I, 5617 San Vicente Blvd, Los Angeles, 1977/ 2021
- Tree Duet II, 5617 San Vicente Blvd, Los Angeles, 1977/ 2021
- Walking, 1978
- Twelve Trees #2, Mulholland Drive off-ramp, San Diego Freeway, northbound, Los Angeles, CA, 1979/ 2015
- Leaning, 1980
- On Dangerous Ground, 1981
- Pink Trash , Lynwood, CA, 1982
- Necklace of Trees, Atlanta Festival for the Arts, Atlanta, GA, 1985-85
- Field/Oasis, 1987
- Bushes at Socrates Sculpture Park, Socrates Sculpture Park, Astoria, Queens, NY, 1988
- Plaza Planters and Tree Grates, Commissions for Downtown Seattle Transit Project, Seattle, WA, 1986–90
- Field, Nasher Sculpture Center, 1989
- Tall Grasses, Roosevelt Island, New York, NY, 1989-90
- Circle of Bushes, for C. W. Post, Long Island University, Brookville, NY, 1991
- Cloud Room, Commission for the Greater Pittsburgh International Airport, Pittsburgh, PA, 1992
- Evening Shadows, University Art Museum, California State University, Long Beach, CA, 1993
- Window Boxes, Whitney Museum at Philip Morris, NY, 1993
- Fence of Leaves, P.S. 8, NY, 1995
- Ancestor Walk, Commission for the New York City Department of Cultural Affairs, 1996
- Consolation, 1996
- Place of Bliss, 2001
- Daily Mask, 1997-2004
- Art in the Garden, Grant Park, Chicago, IL, 2004-5
- Rivers, 2007
- Love Square, 2008/2025
- Sit Upons, 2010
- Whole Cloth, 2017
- Monument 1 (Corner #1), 2018/ 2020
- Tree of Knowledge, 2019
- Monument, 2020
- Paradise Regained, 2020
- Garden, 2020
- And a River Runs Through It, 2020
- Untitled Vessel (Large Body), 2021
- Untitled Vessel (Small Body), 2021
- Untitled Vessel (Beige), 2021
- Window, 2021
- Vessel 1, 2022
- Vessel 2, 2022/ 2024
- Vessel 7, 2022
- Vessel 5, 2022
- Vessel 8, 2022
- Eden 2, 2023
- Eden 3, 2023
- Eden 6, 2023
- Eden 10, 2023
- Vessel 5 (Rope and Wire), 2023
- Vessel 7 and 8 (Rope and Wire), 2023
- Rose Leaf Composition, 2025
- Growing II, 2025
- Wall Composition II, 2025
- Wall Composition III, 2025
- Falls II, 2025
- Cascade, 2025

A work titled Message from Malcolm by Hassinger was installed at the New York City Subway's Central Park North–110th Street station during a 1998 renovation. The work consists of mosaic panels on the platform and the main fare control area's street stairs depicting quotes and writings by Malcolm X written in script and surrounded by mosaic borders.

== Awards and honors ==
- Lifetime Achievement Award from the Women’s Caucus for Art, Maryland Institute College of Art (2009)
- Grants, Joan Mitchell Foundation (1996)
- Anonymous Was a Woman Award (1997)
- Pollock-Krasner Foundation (2007)

== Selected solo exhibitions ==
Maren Hassinger's work has been featured in exhibitions at numerous galleries and institutions including the following solo exhibitions:

- Berkeley Art Museum and Pacific Film Archive, California, Maren Hassinger: Living Moving Growing (2026)
- Douglas F. Cooley Memorial Art Gallery, Reed College, Portland, OR, Las Vegas Ikebana: Maren Hassinger and Senga Nengudi (publication) (2024)
- Art Institute Chicago, Chicago, IL. Maren Hassinger: This Is How We Grow (2023-2024)
- Oklahoma Contemporary Nature, Sweet Nature 2021
- The Studio Museum in Harlem, New York, NY., Maren Hassinger: Monuments, (2018-2019). Site specific works that are located in Marcus Garvey Park.
- Spelman College Museum of Fine Art, Atlanta, Georgia, USA Maren Hassinger: A Retrospective (2015)
- Reginald Ingraham Gallery, Los Angeles, California, USA Maren Hassinger (2014)
- Spelman College Museum of Fine Art, Atlanta, Georgia, USA Maren Hassinger . . . Dreaming (2013)
- Schmucker Gallery, Gettysburg, PA, USA Maren Hassinger: Lives (2010)
- Contemporary Arts Forum and Alice Keck Park, Santa Barbara, CA., Blanket of Branches and Dancing Branches, (1986)
- Los Angeles County Museum of Art, Los Angeles, CA., Gallery Six: Maren Hassinger, (1981)
- Just Above Midtown/Downtown Gallery, New York, NY., Beach, (1980)

== Selected group exhibitions ==
Selected group exhibitions include:

In 2022, the Hammer Museum at University of California, Los Angeles, organized the exhibition Joan Didion: What She Means, curated by The New Yorker theater critic Hilton Als. The show traveled to the Pérez Art Museum Miami in 2023, and works by Maren Hassinger were included alongside artworks by 50 other contemporary international artists such as Félix González-Torres, Vija Celmins, Betye Saar, Ana Mendieta, Silke Otto-Knapp, John Koch, Ed Ruscha, Pat Steir, among others.

- Brooklyn Museum, Brooklyn, NY, We Wanted A Revolution: Black Radical Women 1965-85 (2017)
- Contemporary Arts Museum Houston, Houston, Texas, USA Radical Presence: Black Performance in Contemporary Art (2012)
- Havana Biennial, Cinema Remixed and Reloaded 2.0, (2012)
- Hammer Museum, Los Angeles, California, USA Now Dig This!: Art of Black Los Angeles 1960 –1980 (2011)
- Institute of Contemporary Art, Boston, MA., Dance/Draw, (2011)
- Spelman College Museum of Fine Art, Atlanta, Georgia, USA Material Girls: Contemporary Black Women Artists (2011)
- The Studio Museum in Harlem, New York, NY., VideoStudio: Playback, (2011)
- Reginald F. Lewis Museum, Baltimore, MD., Material Girls, (2011)
- Museum of Arts and Design, New York, NY, Global Africa Project, (2010)
- The Studio Museum in Harlem, New York, NY., 30 Seconds off an Inch, (2009)
