= M. Carl Holman =

American poet (1919–1988)

M. Carl Holman (June 27, 1919 – August 9, 1988) was an American author, poet, playwright, and civil rights advocate. In 1968, Ebony listed him as one of the 100 most influential Black Americans.

== Biography ==
Born June 27, 1919, in Minter City, Mississippi, Holman grew up in St. Louis. He graduated magna cum laude from Lincoln University in 1942 and earned a master's degree from the University of Chicago in 1944. He then earned another master's degree from Yale University in 1954, which he attended on a creative writing scholarship.

Holman taught English at Clark College for 14 years and also taught at Hampton University and Lincoln University.

At one point, Holman edited The Atlanta Inquirer, a weekly African American newspaper at Clark College that reported on civil rights issues in the South. In 1962, he moved to Washington, D.C. to work as an information officer at the Civil Rights Commission. Holman became special assistant to the staff director in 1965 and then deputy director in 1966. He served on the Washington, D.C. Board of Higher Education, which governed the school then known as Federal City College. He also served as a housing consultant to the mayor of Washington, D.C.

From 1971 to 1988, Holman served as president of the National Urban Coalition, an organization formed after the riots of 1967, where he advocated for programs in housing, education, employment, and economic development. At the time, the organization maintained chapters in 48 cities.

He was married to Mariella Ukina Ama Holman after they met at college. They had three children, a daughter, Kinshasha Holman Conwill, and two sons, Kwame Holman and Kwasi Holman. He died on August 9, 1988, in Washington, D.C.
