= Untitled (Rape Scene) =

Artwork by Ana Mendieta

Untitled (Rape Scene) is a color photograph documentation created from a 35mm slide by Cuban American artist Ana Mendieta. She made it during an April 1973 performance while a student at the University of Iowa. It is one of three photographs Mendieta created in reaction to the rape and murder of Sarah Ann Ottens, a 20-year old student on campus. The photograph depicts Mendieta naked from the waist down, smeared with blood, bent over, and bound to a table. The Tate Gallery in London, which owns the work, describes the work this way:

Mendieta invited her fellow students to her apartment where, through a door left purposefully ajar, they found her in the position recorded in this photograph, which recreated the scene as reported in the press. Some time later, Mendieta recalled that her audience "all sat down, and started talking about it. I didn’t move. I stayed in position about an hour. It really jolted them." In 1980, she commented that the rape had "moved and frightened" her, elaborating: "I think all my work has been like that – a personal response to a situation ... I can’t see being theoretical about an issue like that." On another occasion she explained that she had created this work "as a reaction against the idea of violence against women."

Art writer Megan Heuer describes the work as capturing the artist's interest in violence. Influenced by the work of the Viennese Actionists, Untitled (Rape Scene) also expresses Mendieta's desire to evoke a visceral reaction from her audience.

== Bibliography ==
- Moure, Gloria (1996). Ana Mendieta. Barcelona: Fundació Antoni Tàpies. ISBN 978-84-88786-12-8. OCLC 901073210.
- Szymanek, Angelique. "Bloody Pleasures: Ana Mendieta's Violent Tableaux," Signs: Journal of Women in Culture and Society 41, no. 4 (Summer 2016): 895–925.
- Viso, Olga M. Ana Mendieta: Earth Body, Sculpture and Performance 1972–1985, exhibition catalogue, Hirshhorn Museum and Sculpture Garden, Smithsonian Institution, Washington DC, 2004.
