= Dale Brockman Davis =

American visual artist (born 1945)

- Born: November 11, 1945 (age 80); Tuskegee, Alabama, U.S.
- Education: Los Angeles City College, University of Southern California (BFA), University of California, Los Angeles
- Occupation(s): Visual artist, gallerist, educator
- Known for: Sculptor
- Movement: African American history, music
- Relatives: Alonzo Davis (brother)
- Awards: Leimert Park Art Festival, First Place in Sculpture

Dale Brockman Davis (born 1945) is an American visual artist, gallerist and educator based in Los Angeles. He was best known for his assemblage sculpture and ceramic work that addresses themes of African American history and music, especially jazz. Along with his brother, artist Alonzo Davis, he co-founded Brockman Gallery in Leimert Park. Through the gallery and his broader community work, Davis became an important promoter of African-American artists in Los Angeles.

== Early life and education ==
Davis was born on November 11, 1945, in Tuskegee, Alabama. He moved to Los Angeles in 1956.

He studied at Los Angeles City College, before earning his B.F.A. at the University of Southern California. There he studied with noted ceramist F. Carlton Ball.

He would eventually move beyond vessels and other traditional ceramic forms, instead focusing on sculpture. He was inspired by assemblage art scene that emerged in Los Angeles's African-American community following the Watts Rebellion of 1965. He did graduate work towards a M.F.A. degree at the University of California, Los Angeles but stopped the program after encountering resistance towards his assemblage style.

Davis worked as an art teacher and chairman of the art department at Dorsey High School.

== Brockman Gallery ==
Davis and his brother Alonzo Davis founded and operated Brockman Gallery from 1967 to 1990. They named the gallery after their grandmother, Della Brockman. They showcased the work of African-American artists from Los Angeles and elsewhere, provided them with a rare opportunity to exhibit and sell their work in Los Angeles's segregated art scene. By the early 1970s, the brothers had transformed the gallery into a broader community art space, and hosted a festival in Leimert Park. In 2019, Davis donated the Brockman Gallery Archive to the Los Angeles Public Library.

== Awards ==
- Leimert Park Art Festival, "First Place in Sculpture"

== Galleries ==
Gallery shows include:

- Gallery Negra
- Bob Jefferson Gallery, Oakland
- Ankrum Gallery, Los Angeles
- Brockman Gallery, Los Angeles

== Group exhibitions ==
He has appeared in many exhibitions, including:

- California Black Craftsmen, Mills College Art Gallery, 1970
- Eleven from California, Studio Museum in Harem, 1972
- Los Angeles 1972: A Panorama of Black Artists, Los Angeles County Museum of Art, 1972
- Collage and Assemblage, Los Angeles Institute of Contemporary Art, 1975
- Black Art: The LA Connection, Los Angeles Convention Center, 1982
- Artists Teachers, Museum of African American Art, Santa Monica, 1983
- Watts: Art and Social Change in Los Angeles, Haggerty Museum of Art, Marquette University, 2003
- L.A. Object and David Hammons Body Prints, Tilton Gallery, 2006
- Distinctly Los Angeles: An African American Perspective, M. Hanks Gallery, Santa Monica, 2009
- Now Dig This! Art & Black Los Angeles, 1960-1980, Hammer Museum, 2011
- Places of Validation, California African American Museum, 2011
- Diverted Destruction 6, California African American Museum and Loft at Liz's, 2013
- New Digs/Old Finds: Dale Davis, Assemblage Sculptures (solo exhibition), Loft2, San Pedro, 2019
