= Alonzo Davis =

American artist, educator (1942–2025)

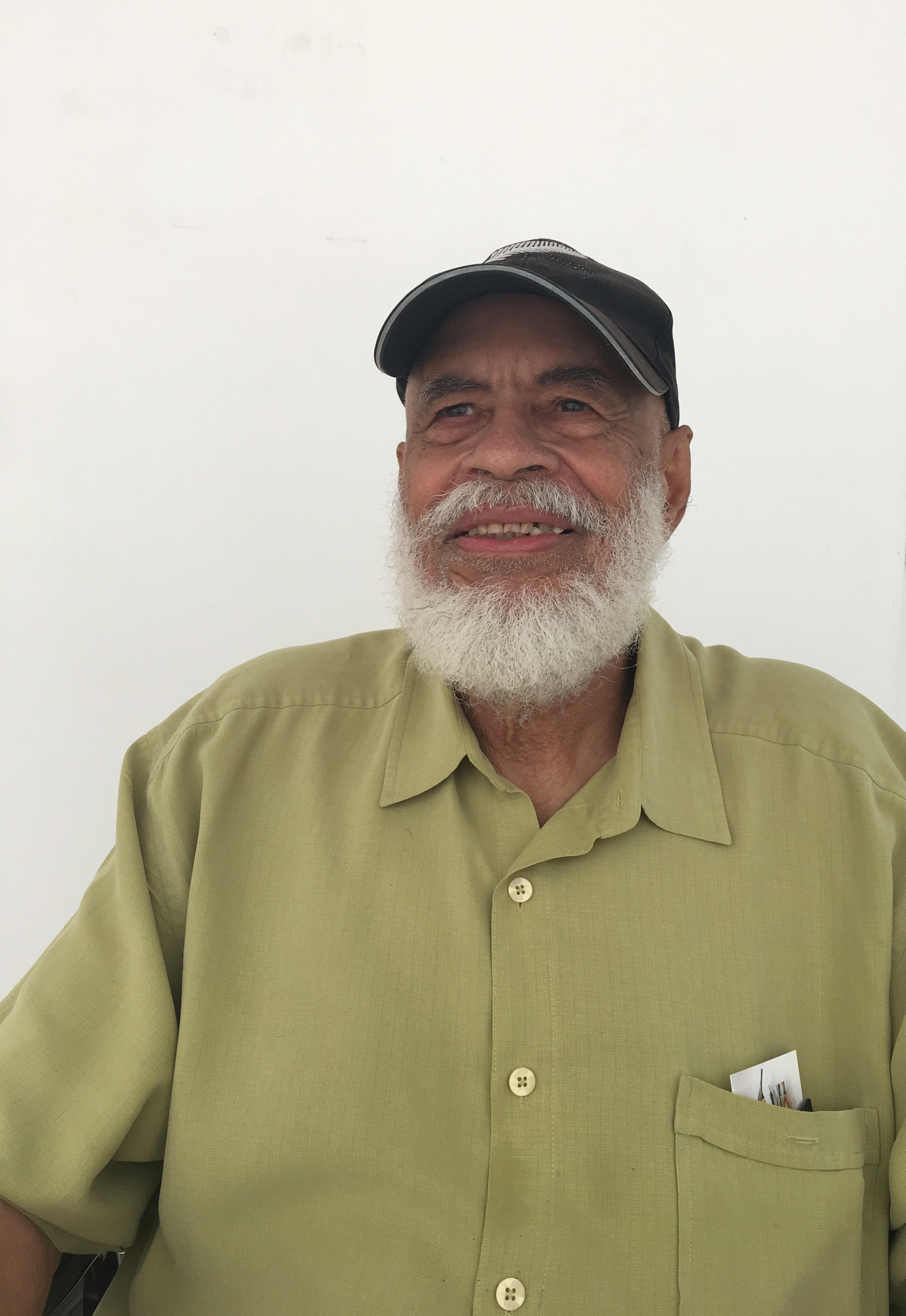
- Alonzo Davis, 2019
- Born: February 2, 1942; Tuskegee, Alabama, U.S.
- Died: January 27, 2025 (aged 82); Largo, Maryland, U.S.
- Education: Pepperdine University (BFA, 1964); Otis Art Institute (BFA, 1971; MFA, 1973)
- Occupation(s): Visual artist, gallerist, educator
- Spouse: Rebecca Braithwaite (divorced)
- Relatives: Dale Brockman Davis (brother)
- Website: alonzodavis.com

Alonzo Joseph Davis Jr. (February 2, 1942 – January 27, 2025) was an American visual artist, gallerist, and educator. He is known for co-founding the Brockman Gallery in Los Angeles with his brother Dale Brockman Davis. In reaction to a perceived lack of coverage of black art, Davis became an advocate for black art and artists. His best-known work is the Eye on '84 mural he painted to commemorate the 1984 Summer Olympics.

== Background ==
Davis was born on February 2, 1942, in Tuskegee, Alabama. He grew up near Tuskegee University where his father was a professor of psychology. Davis's family moved from Tuskegee, Alabama to Los Angeles, California in 1955 where he was exposed to Asian art. Davis became a practitioner of Zen meditation although he did not convert to Buddhism. Davis, then an art student at Pepperdine, disagreed with the overwhelmingly white focus of his coursework and sought to understand the black art scene in America. He and his brother Dale, also an artist, traveled across the country to meet other black artists including the Spiral art collective in Harlem led by Romare Bearden and Hale Woodruff.

Davis moved to Sacramento in 1987, and to a residency in Hawaii in 1988. He later moved to Hyattsville, Maryland, and died at a hospital in nearby Largo, Maryland, on January 27, 2025, at the age of 82.

== Brockman Gallery ==
The Davis brothers opened the Brockman Gallery in 1967 on Degnan Avenue in Leimert Park. They got the idea for opening the Brockman Gallery during the drive back to Southern California from the 1966 Meredith March in Jackson, Mississippi. The name "Brockman" refers to Alonzo and Dale's maternal grandmother's maiden name. In 1973 the brothers also founded a non-profit organization called Brockman Productions to support art in the African-American community.

== Teaching career ==
Alonzo taught at Crenshaw High School until 1970 when he left to teach at series of schools including Manual Arts High School, Mount Saint Antonio College, Pasadena City College, and UCLA. Davis participated in Ruth G. Waddy's "Art West Associated" movement to agitate for the inclusion of black art in the mainstream museums of Los Angeles. In 1976 Davis started working at Brockman Gallery full-time.

From 1991 to 1992, Davis taught at the San Antonio Art Institute. He then served as dean of the Memphis College of Art from 1993 to 2002.

Davis, an alum of the Virginia Center for the Creative Arts, has a fellowship offered there in his name for writers, composers, and artists of African or Latino ethnicity.

== Visual art career ==
Davis painted a mural, Eye on '84, one of the ten murals commissioned under Los Angeles' 1984 Olympic Murals project. Davis's mural was located on the southbound I-110 at the Third Street on-ramp across from Judy Baca's Hitting the Wall. His mural, acrylic on concrete, depicted a series of internationally recognizable symbols including the Olympic Rings. The mural suffered weathering and was considered unrecoverable. The mural was painted over in 2001 by Caltrans.
