= Silke Otto-Knapp =

German artist (1970-2022)

- Born: Silke Otto-Knapp; 1970; Germany
- Died: 2022 (aged 51–52)

Silke Otto-Knapp (1970–2022) was a German artist. Her work was shown at numerous galleries and shows including the Bienal de São Paulo. the Istanbul Biennial and the Liverpool Biennial. Her estate is represented by Galerie Buchholz, Cologne/Berlin/New York and greengrassi, London.

== Education and career ==
Otto-Knapp attended the university of Hildesheim and received her MFA from Chelsea College of Art and Design in London. Her landscape paintings are known for being based on historical documentation of stage designs and performances. Her laying watercolor only to wash them down and then apply them anew resulted in a body of work conspicuous for establishing the coexistence of conflicting spaces which give rise to an intrinsic tension. Her work was relatable in many different types of aspects.

== Exhibitions (selection) ==
Otto-Knapp has held solo exhibitions at the Renaissance Society, Chicago (2020); the Art Gallery of Ontario, Toronto (2015); the Kunsthalle Wien and the Camden Arts Centre, London (2014); the Kunsthal Charlottenborg, Copenhagen (2013); the Kunstverein Munich (2010); and the Tate Britain, London (2005).

She died in October 2022 of ovarian cancer.
