= Senga Nengudi =

African-American visual artist (born 1943)

- Born: Sue Irons; September 18, 1943 (age 83); Chicago, Illinois, U.S.
- Education: California State University, Los Angeles, Waseda University
- Occupations: Artist, Sculptor, Curator, Dancer
- Years active: 1960s–present
- Known for: Visual art
- Movement: Studio Z, Performance Art, Sculpture
- Spouse: Elliott Fittz
- Awards: Nasher Prize Laureate 2023
- Website: www.sengasenga.com

Senga Nengudi (née Sue Irons; born September 18, 1943) is an African-American visual artist and curator. She is best known for her abstract sculptures that combine found objects and choreographed performance. She is part of a group of African-American avant-garde artists working in New York City and Los Angeles, from the 1960s and onward.

Nengudi was named the 2023 Nasher Prize Laureate for her contribution to the discipline of sculpture.

On March 16, 2026, the Robert Rauschenberg Foundation awarded Nengudi its Rauschenberg Centennial Award for art. The award gives the recipient $100,000, as well as an invitation to participate in the Foundation’s Captiva Residency program.

== Early life and education ==
Nengudi was born Sue Irons in Chicago, Illinois in 1943. Following the death of her father in 1949, she moved to Los Angeles and Pasadena with her mother. As a result of an existing segregated school system, Nengudi found herself in between schools, transferring back and forth between Los Angeles and Pasadena. Her cousin Eileen Abdulrashid is also an artist.

Following her graduation from Dorsey High School, Nengudi studied art and dance during the 1960s at California State University, Los Angeles, graduating with a bachelor's degree in 1967. She then spent a year studying at Waseda University in Tokyo, in the hopes of learning more about the Gutai Art Association. In 1967, she returned to California State University, from which she received a Master of Arts degree in sculpture in 1971. During college, in 1965, she interned at the Watts Towers Art Center when Noah Purifoy was the director. She also worked as an art instructor at the Pasadena Art Museum and the Fine Arts Community Workshop.

She moved to New York City shortly thereafter to continue her career as an artist, and she traveled back and forth between New York City and Los Angeles frequently. In 2016 she received an honorary arts degree from Colorado College. She works in Colorado Springs, Colorado where she lives with her husband, Elliott Fittz.

== Career ==
Nengudi was part of the radical, avant-garde Black art scenes in both New York City and Los Angeles, during the 1960s and 1970s. Cheryl Banks was another artist who collaborated closely with Nengudi and with whom she corresponded frequently about their work.

She worked with two galleries in particular: Pearl C. Woods Gallery in Los Angeles (owned and directed by Greg Pitts), and Just Above Midtown (JAM) in New York City. JAM was owned and directed by Linda Goode Bryant, who influenced Nengudi. She has described the creative energies of working with galleries like these that were, "trying to break down the walls" for the black artist community.

=== Studio Z collective and performance ===
In the late 1970s, Nengudi worked under Brockman Gallery's CETA-funded arts program, where she met Maren Hassinger. This program allowed Nengudi and Hassinger to create Ceremony for Freeway Fets, a performance with artists David Hammons, Franklin Parker and others who were part of Studio Z. This collective was comprised African American artists "distinguished by their experimental and improvisational practice." Hammons and Hassinger became frequent collaborators with her work. Other members of Studio Z included Ronn Davis, Duval Lewis, RoHo, Barbara McCullough, Houston Conwill, and Joe Ray (artist). In 1978, Nengudi paired with Hassinger for a performance piece in which the two artists improvised movement while entangled inside a large web of pantyhose. The performance symbolized the ways in which women are restricted by societal gender norms. Nengudi also took many staged photographs during this period. She often appeared anonymously in them herself as a genderless figure, defying definition.

=== Themes of work ===
Complicating cultural, ethnic and racial classification became as central to Nengudi's work as her handling of gender constraints. She often combines African, Asian and Native American art forms in particular for her performance pieces and staged photographs. While her oeuvre highlights issues surrounding gender, race and ethnicity, Nengudi's work focuses on the ways in which everyone is negatively affected by these systematic forces and her pieces attempt to foster cross-cultural inspiration for men and women alike.

She often cites African and Eastern philosophies as underpinning her work.

== Work ==
=== R.S.V.P. series, 1975–1977 ===
In 1975, following the birth of her son and seeing the changes in her body, Nengudi began her R.S.V.P. series (also known as repondez s’il vous plait), for which she is best known. Combining her interest in movement and sculpture, Nengudi created abstract sculptures of everyday objects through choreographed sets which were either performed in front of a live audience or captured on camera. The sculptures were made from everyday objects, like pantyhose, and parts were stretched, twisted, knotted, and filled with sand. The finished sculptures, originally intended to be able to be touched by the audience, were often hung on gallery walls but stretched across gallery space, evoking the forms of bodily organs, sagging breasts, and a mother's womb. For her, the use of pantyhose as a material reflected the elasticity of the human body, especially the female body. These sculptures as well as her later performance pieces involving pantyhose expressed a mélange of sensuality, race identity, body image, and societal impacts on women's bodies.

Despite having been increasingly involved in the African American artist community in Los Angeles, when the "R.S.V.P." series made its debut, there was no significant public interest in her work. One of Nengudi's close friends and one of her art collaborators, David Hammons brought forth an explanation for the public's lack of interest in Nengudi's work, ascribing it to the abstract aesthetic present in many of Nengudi's pieces throughout the 1960s and the 1970s. Furthermore, Nengudi's "R.S.V.P" sculptures differed greatly from most of the art work made popular by her artistic peers in Los Angeles and New York. Nengudi was made aware of the perception of her art by the public as it compared to artwork made by her peers, particularly in New York, where some people felt she was not making "black art."

Nengudi's "R.S.V.P." sculptures have made more recent appearances in traveling group shows, including in the exhibition, Now Dig This! Art & Black Los Angeles 1960–1980 (from 2011–2013) and Blues for Smoke (2013).

=== Ceremony for Freeway Fets (1978) ===
Nengudi and members of the Studio Z collective (including Hammons and Hassinger) performed, Ceremony for Freeway Fets (1978) under a freeway overpass on Pico Boulevard in Los Angeles. Nengudi designed costumes and headdresses made of pantyhose for the performers. Hammons and Hassinger played the roles of male and female spirits, with Nengudi performing as a spirit to unite the genders. Both the dance performance and soundtrack, performed by members of Studio Z, were improvised.

=== Warp Trance (2007) ===
During her 2007 residency at the Fabric Workshop and Museum in Philadelphia, Nengudi incorporated video art into her practice for the first time. During visits to textile mills around the state, she recorded video and audio footage of the textile mills in full operation, and she also collected objects, like Jacquard punch cards, which were used to program Jacquard loom machines, mechanizing textile mills. In the final installation, Nengudi projected video footage onto a vertical screen of punch cards in a space with ambient sound from the audio recordings. The work explores themes of technology, the politics of labor, contemporary music, and the repetition of ritual dance.

=== Poetry and curation ===
In addition to her installations, sculpture, and performances, Nengudi also creates paintings, photography and poetry. She has also curated exhibits, including the solo show of Kira Lynn Harris at the Cue Art Foundation in New York in the spring of 2009.

She writes poetry under the pseudonyms Harriet Chin, Propecia Lee, and Lily B. Moor. In an interview, Nengudi explained how she decided to use these pseudonyms:

"It all started when I saw a rack of postcards with art that was incredible and very African-looking, but then when I turned over the postcard and saw that the artist was white, I thought, "What the heck?" Later I questioned why I responded that way. I thought about this issue of naming, and how we jump to conclusions based on the ethnicity of a name. Of course, if there is no name attached, then people just have to respond to the work in itself. But if it's work by someone named "Yamamoto" or "Rodriguez," there's immediately another filter that we put on to view it. The different names I use all have a personal thread related to them. I want it to be like Br'er Rabbit, trying to be the trickster, to play with things, and to make people look at things differently." --Senga Nengudi

== Exhibitions ==
Nengudi has staged a large number of solo shows at galleries and museums in the United States and internationally. Her solo shows include Senga Nengudi (1971), California State University, Los Angeles; Vestige: The Discovery of America by Christopher Columbus’ S.D. (1981), Just Above Midtown Gallery, New York; Warp Trance (2007), Pennsylvania Academy of the Fine Arts, Philadelphia; Senga Nengudi: Improvisational Gestures (2015-2018), originating at the University of Colorado Colorado Springs Galleries of Contemporary Art; Head Back & High: Senga Nengudi, Performance Objects (1976 – 2015) (2018), originating at the Baltimore Museum of Art; and Senga Nengudi: Topologies (2021) at the Philadelphia Museum of Art.

The artist has also participated in a wide array of group shows and exhibitions, including the 57th Venice Biennale (2017). Her work was included in the 2024 exhibition Making Their Mark: Works from the Shah Garg Collection at the Berkeley Art Museum and Pacific Film Archive (BAMPFA).

== Notable works in public collections ==
- Water Composition I (1970, refabricated 2019), Dia Art Foundation, Beacon, New York; and Solomon R. Guggenheim Museum, New York
- R.S.V.P. (1975), Museum of Contemporary Art, Los Angeles
- R.S.V.P. Fall 1976 (1976, refabricated 2017), Museum of Contemporary Art, Chicago
- R.S.V.P. V (1976), Studio Museum in Harlem, New York
- R.S.V.P. X (1976, refabricated 2014), Hirshhorn Museum and Sculpture Garden, Smithsonian Institution, Washington, D.C.
- Swing Low (1976, refabricated 2014), Los Angeles County Museum of Art
- Untitled (1976), Museum of Modern Art, New York
- Inside/Outside (1977), Brooklyn Museum, New York
- Internal I (1977, refabricated 2014), Whitney Museum, New York
- Internal II (1977, refabricated 2015), Tate, London
- Performance with "Inside/Outside" (1977), Museum of Modern Art, New York; and Smithsonian American Art Museum, Smithsonian Institution, Washington, D.C.
- R.S.V.P. I (1977, refabricated 2003), Museum of Modern Art, New York
- R.S.V.P. XI (1977, refabricated 2004), Carnegie Museum of Art, Pittsburgh
- R.S.V.P. Reverie-"B" Suite (1977, refabricated 2011), Institute of Contemporary Art, Boston
- Ceremony for Freeway Fets (1978), Museum of Contemporary Art, Los Angeles
- R.S.V.P. Performance Piece (1978, refabricated 2012), Musée National d'Art Moderne, Paris
- Revery - R (2011), Hammer Museum, Los Angeles
- R.S.V.P. Reverie "Bow Leg" (2014), Museum of Fine Arts, Houston

== Selected publications ==
- Nengudi, Senga; Fabric Workshop and Museum (2007). Senga Nengudi. Philadelphia, Pennsylvania: Fabric Workshop and Museum.
- Nengudi, Senga; Warehouse Gallery (2012). Senga Nengudi : lov u. Syracuse, New York: Warehouse Gallery.
- Nengudi, Senga; Claus, Elisabeth (2012). Senga Nengudi. Aschaffenburg, Bavaria: Neuer Kunstverein Aschaffenburg e.V. KunstLANDing.
- Nengudi, Senga; Jones, Kellie; White Cube (2014). Senga Nengudi : alt. London, England: White Cube. ISBN 1906072876
- Nengudi, Senga; Jones, Kellie; Luard, Honey; Feaver, Dorothy; White Cube (2014). Senga Nengudi : Alt : inside the White Cube. ISBN 9781906072872
- Nengudi, Senga; Burnett Abrams, Nora; Auther, Elissa; Jones, Amelia; Pitts Angaza, Gregory (2015). Senga Nengudi : improvisational gestures. Denver, Colorado: Museum of Contemporary Art Denver. ISBN 9780692536254
- Nengudi, Senga; Yasar, Begum; Bradley, Rizvana; Lévy, Dominique (2016). Senga Nengudi : [September 10 – October 24, 2015]. New York City; London, England: Dominique Lévy. ISBN 9781944379025
