= Houston Conwill =

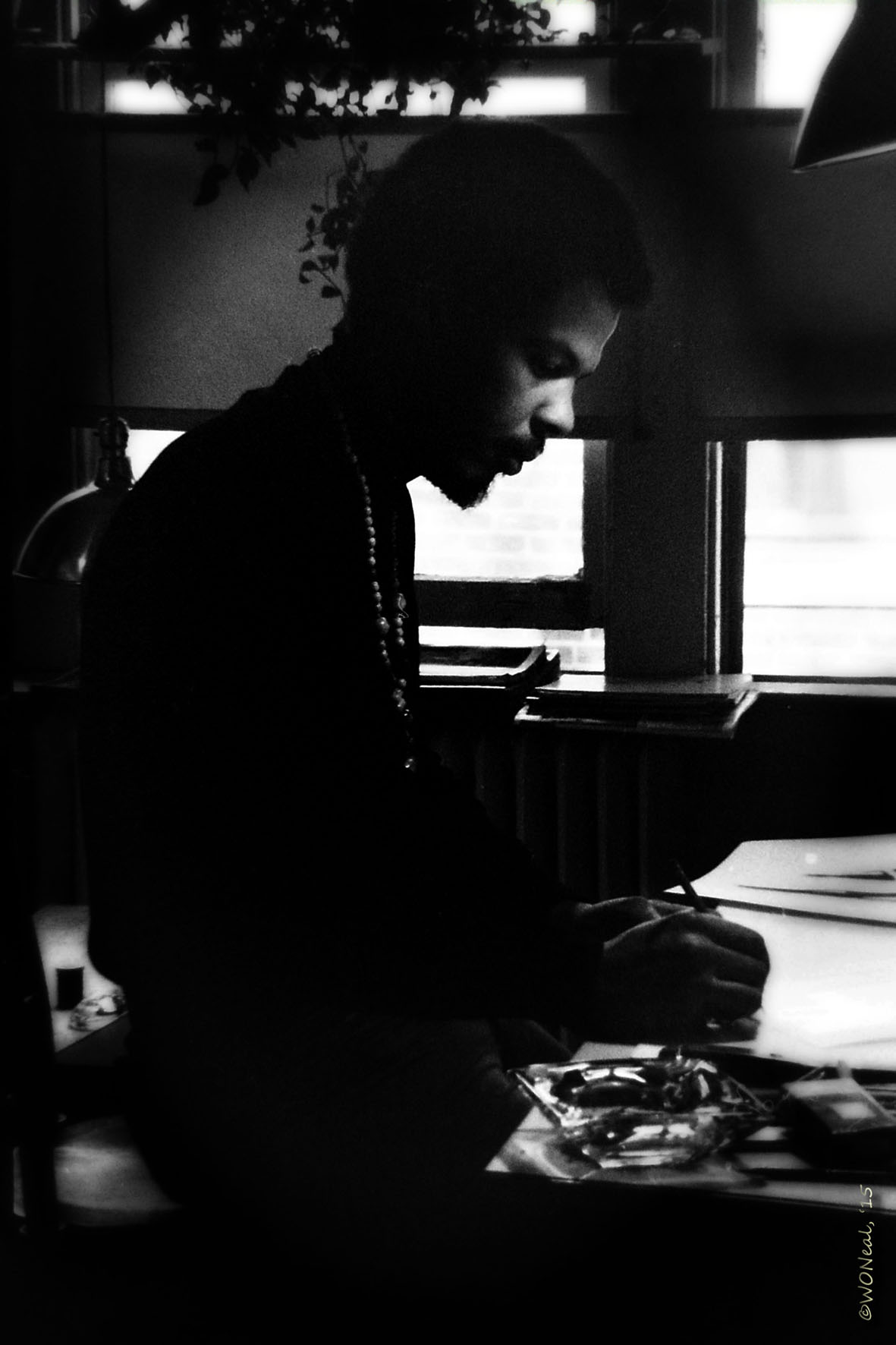
- Houston Conwill in 1974, Washington D.C.
- Born: April 2, 1947; Louisville, Kentucky, U.S.
- Died: November 14, 2016 (aged 69); The Bronx, New York, U.S.
- Education: Howard University; University of Southern California
- Occupation: Artist
- Years active: 1971–2016

Houston Eugene Conwill (April 2, 1947 – November 14, 2016) was an American multidisciplinary artist known best for large-scale public sculptural installations. Conwill was a sculptor, painter, and performance and conceptual artist whose site-specific works explore and celebrate spirituality and African-American artists, activists, and intellectuals. Studio Museum in Harlem recognised his body of work as a "lasting monument to black culture."

== Early life and career ==
Houston Eugene Conwill was born on April 2, 1947, in Louisville, Kentucky, to Mary Luella Herndon, an educator, and Giles Adolph Conwill, a waiter. He was the third of their six children. His father died when he was a child and his maternal grandmother (Estella Houston, who he was named for) played an important role in his upbringing. Conwill was raised Catholic, his mother a teacher and administrator at a predominantly black parochial school. His sister Estella Conwill Majozo is an author, poet, and professor. At least one of his brothers, Giles Conwill, went on to join the priesthood. For a time, in his late teens, Conwill lived in Saint Meinrad Archabbey, a monastery in Saint Meinrad, Indiana.

After joining the Air Force in 1966 where he served three years until the fall of 1970, he enrolled in Howard University's art department. During his time at Howard, Conwill worked with Sam Gilliam, Lois Mailou Jones, and Skunder Boghossian, and took in the displays of traditional African art exhibited in Howard's gallery. It was here, and in his first student exhibition in 1971, that Conwill started making works with canvases stretched over pyramid shapes, a motif that would recur throughout his artistic career. Conwill was graduated from Howard in 1973 and moved with his wife, fellow Howard art school graduate Kinshasha Holman Conwill, to California. Houston pursued his master's degree from University of Southern California and Kinshasha worked at curator of Frank Lloyd Wright's Hollyhock House, where they lived for two years.

== Personal life ==
Conwill married Karen Holman (also known as Kinshasha Holman Conwill) in a Ghanaian ceremony at Metropolitan Baptist Church in Washington D.C. in 1971. Conwill died on November 14, 2016, of prostate cancer.

== Significant works ==
In 1989, Conwill produced an installation piece for the Museum of Modern Art's series, Projects, called The Cakewalk Humanifesto: A Cultural Libation. An etched-glass frame, reminiscent of the rose window at Chartres, was etched with words and maps, projecting patterns onto the marble floor of the gallery. The piece also featured a table on which rested a book of letters, written by his sister, Estella. Readings of the letters were a component of the exhibition. Perhaps Conwill's most prominent work is Rivers, his terrazzo and brass floor design at the New York Public Library's Schomburg Center for Research in Black Culture. Unveiled in February 1992, the floor honors poet Langston Hughes whose ashes are buried in a book-shaped urn within the design. The name of the work, Rivers, is in reference to Hughes's poem "The Negro Speaks of Rivers", and includes visual elements from Yoruba, Haitian voodou, and Christian traditions. Conwill again collaborated with his sister, Estella, as well as architect Joseph De Pace.

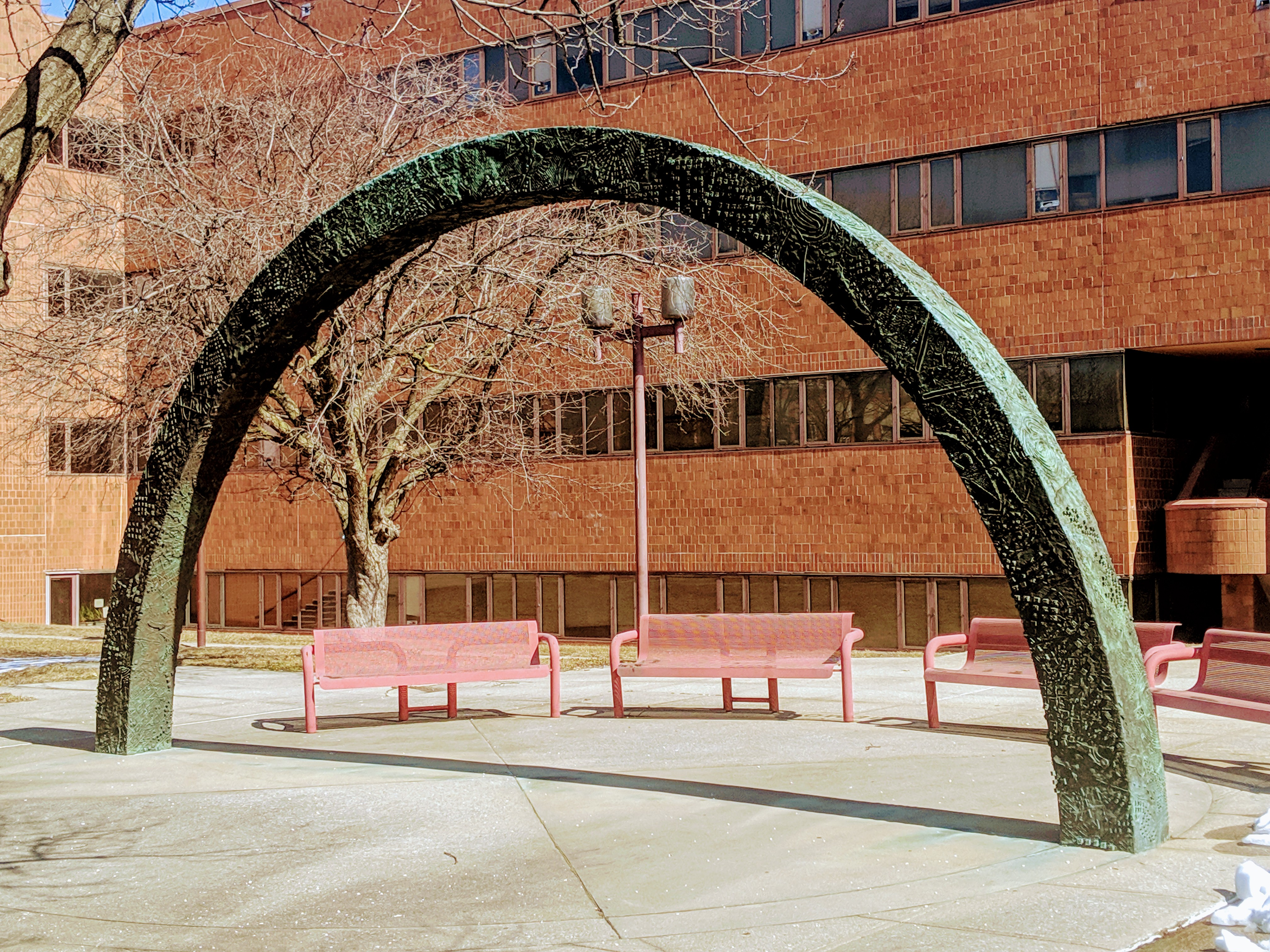
ARC (1986) by Houston Conwill - composed of African brass in concrete, whose shadow tracks etched and inlaid metal circles in the pavement beneath

In 1986 Arc, a large scale installation, was created by Conwill for the 160th Street entrance to the York College, CUNY campus. Arc has a span of 26 feet, it is composed of metals, commonly known as "African brass", embedded in concrete. It is covered by inlays of various symbols rising out of the surface created by arc spraying, a technique in which an electric arc melts metal wires onto the surface. Arc is oxidized to a teal green color, similar to New York City's Statue of Liberty. The piece includes three inlaid metal circles embedded in nearby concrete pavements. Each circle has one word repeated twice in capital letters. 'MEMORY' is placed beneath the arched feature, followed by 'VISION' a few stairs over and then, few steps away is 'IMAGINATION'. Each circle is divided into four equal sections with inlaid lines reminiscent of Yowa, the Kongo cosmogram for the continuity of human life through reincarnation. Many symbols are used by Africans to represent the retention of their culture in the United States of America. Depending on the time of day and the sun's position, the shadow of Arc moves over the metal circles in the ground surrounding it.

Conwill's work is in the permanent collections of Museum of Modern Art in New York; the Hirshhorn Museum and Sculpture Garden in Washington, D.C.; the Museum of Contemporary Art, Los Angeles; and the Studio Museum in Harlem.

=== List of selected works ===
- The Joyful Mysteries (1984–2034 A.D.), (1984) at the Studio Museum in Harlem, New York
- Arc (1986) at York College, CUNY, New York
- The Open Secret, (1986) mezzanine of 125th Street, New York
- The Cakewalk Humanifesto: A Cultural Libation (1989) at MOMA, New York
- Poets Rise (1989) exterior of Joseph P. Addabbo Federal Building, Jamaica, Queens, New York
- Rivers (1992) at the Schomburg Center for Research in Black Culture, New York
- Du Sable's Journey (1991), with Estella Majoza and Joseph De Pace, in the Harold Washington Library, Chicago
- Revelation (1993), also known as the Martin Luther King Jr. Memorial, with Estella Majoza and Joseph De Pace, at Yerba Buena Gardens, San Francisco
- New Calypso (1994), with Estella Conwill Majoza and Joseph De Pace, in Park West Station, Miami
- The New Ring Shout (1995), in the Ted Weiss Federal Building (near the African Burial Ground National Monument), New York, New York

== Selected exhibitions ==
- 1976 JuJu, The Gallery, Los Angeles
- 1980 Passages: Earth/Space H3, Nexus Gallery, Atlanta
- 1981 Easter Shout!, PS1, New York
- 1982 Afro-American Abstraction, Los Angeles Municipal Art Gallery, Los Angeles
- 1986 Houston Conwill: The Passion of St. Matthew—Painting and Sculpture, Alternative Museum, New York
- 1990 Houston Conwill: Project Series, Museum of Modern Art, New York
- 1990 Hirshhorn WORKS 89: Daniel Buren, Buster Simpson, Houston Conwill, Matt Mullican / Sidney Lawrence, Ned Rifkin, and Phyllis Rosenzweig, Hirshhorn Museum and Sculpture Garden, Washington, D.C.
- 1990 The Decade Show: Frameworks of Identity in the 1980s, New Museum of Contemporary Art, Museum of Contemporary Hispanic Art, and Studio Museum in Harlem, New York
- 2013 Now Dig This! Art and Black, Los Angeles 1960–1980, MOMA PS1, New York

== Awards and honours ==
- 1982 John Simon Guggenheim Memorial Foundation fellowship
- 1984 Rome Prize (USA)
- 1987 Louis Comfort Tiffany Foundation award
