= Collect Pond =

Historic pond in Manhattan, New York

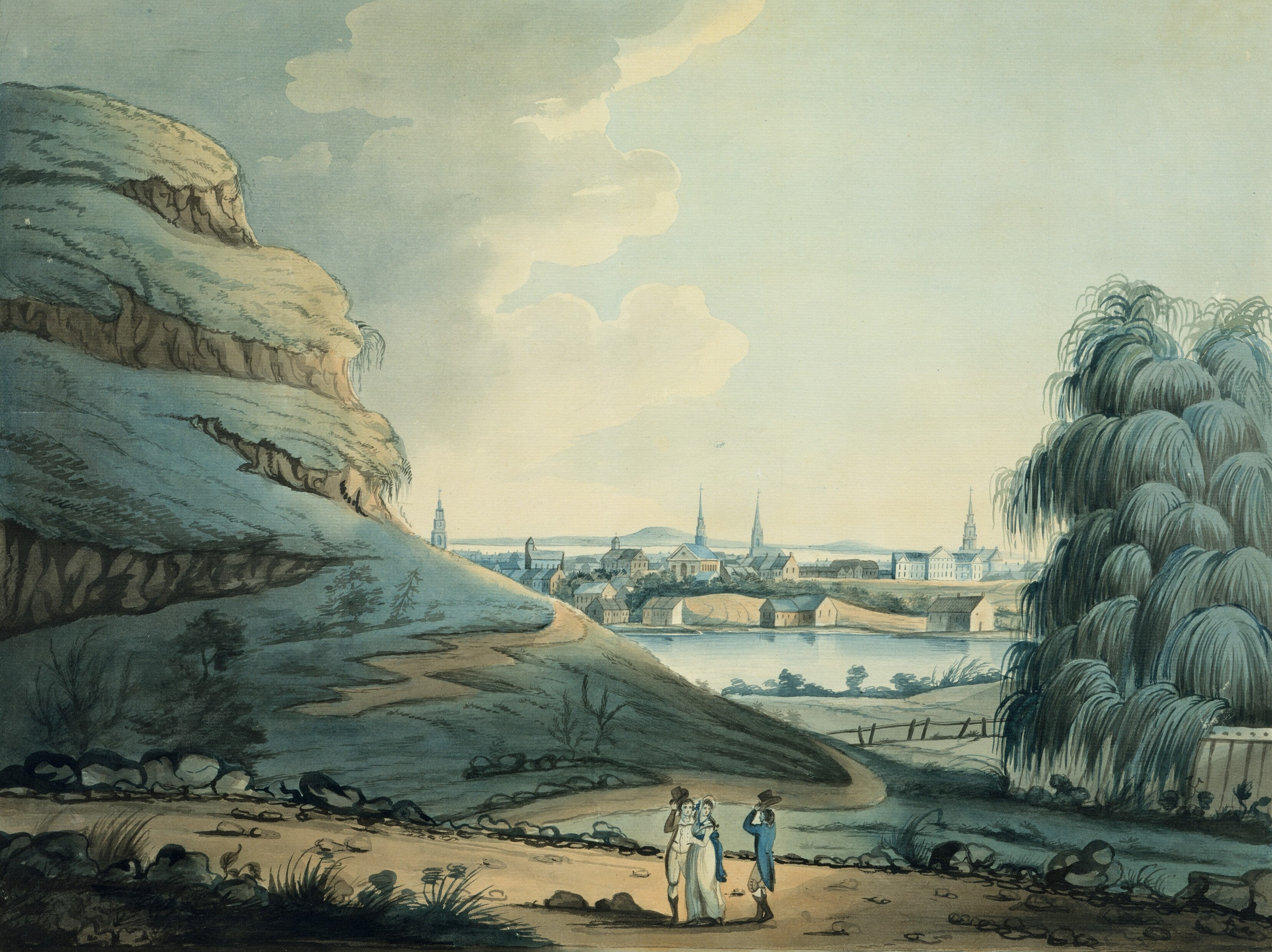
A 1798 watercolor of Collect Pond. Bayard's Mount, a 110-foot (34 m) hillock, is in the left foreground. Prior to being levelled around 1811 it was located near the current intersection of Mott and Grand Streets. New York City, which then extended to a stockade which ran approximately north–southeast from today's Chambers Street and Broadway, is visible beyond the southern shore.

Collect Pond, or Fresh Water Pond, was a body of fresh water in what is now Chinatown in Lower Manhattan, New York City. For the first two centuries of European settlement in Manhattan, it was the main New York City water supply system for the growing city. A jail was later built on the former pond. In the 20th century, the site became Collect Pond Park (40.7163°N 74.0019°W), which includes a reflecting pool to acknowledge the historic importance of this body of water.

== Pond description ==
The pond occupied approximately 48 acres (190,000 m^{2}) and was as deep as 60 feet (18 m). Fed by an underground spring, it was located in a valley, with Bayard's Mount (at 110 feet or 34 metres the tallest hill in lower Manhattan) to the northeast and Kalck Hoek (Dutch for Chalk Point, named for the numerous oyster shell middens left by the indigenous Native American inhabitants) to the west. A stream flowed north out of the pond and then west through a salt marsh (which, after being drained, became a meadow by the name of "Lispenard Meadows") to the Hudson River, while another stream issued from the southeastern part of the pond in an easterly direction to the East River.

The southwestern shore of Collect Pond was the site of a Native American settlement known as Werpoes. A small band of Munsee, the northernmost division of the Lenape, occupied the site. The Munsee continued to live at Collect Pond until the Dutch settlement of New Amsterdam was established in the 17th century. It is possible that members of this band were the participants in the sale of Manhattan to the Dutch.

Collect Pond was used as a terms of boundary for night watch duties in 1731 under John Montgomerie's charter during the British rule in New York City. The pond was home to a copious amount of fish, and in 1734 legislation was passed preventing the use of nets in the pond. This was prior to the extreme pollution to the pond, which included the dumping of dead animals.

== 18th century ==
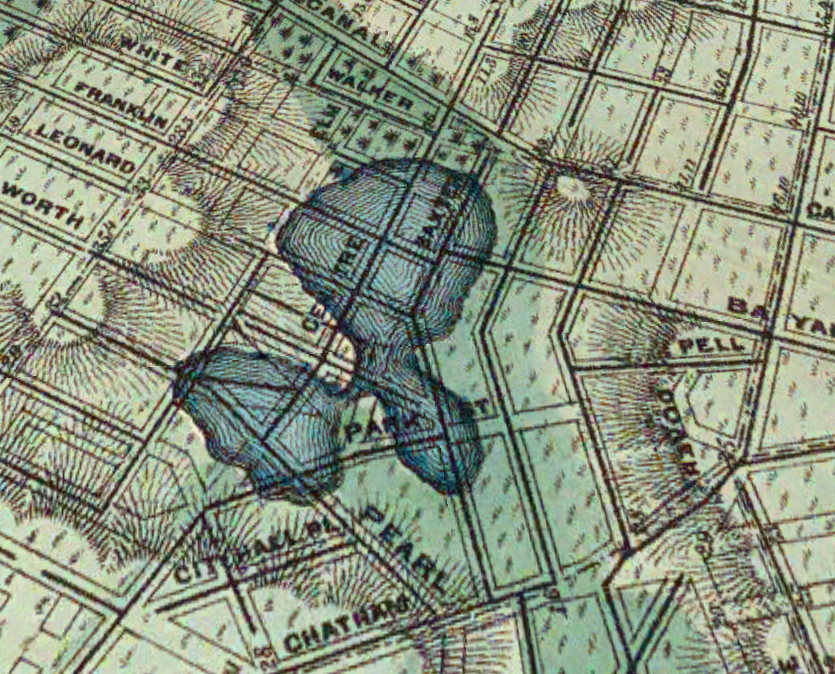
Collect Pond and Five Points on the topographical map by Egbert Viele. The Five Points intersection is where Mosco Street (marked here as Park Street) intersected with Baxter Street (formerly Orange Street) and Worth Street (formerly Anthony Street).

In the 18th century, the pond was used as a picnic area during summer and a skating rink during the winter. Beginning in the early 18th century, various commercial enterprises were built along the shores of the pond in order to use the water. These businesses included Coulthards Brewery, Nicholas Bayard's slaughterhouse on Mulberry Street (which was nicknamed "Slaughterhouse Street"), numerous tanneries on the southeastern shore, and the pottery works of German immigrants Johan Willem Crolius and Johan Remmey on Pot Bakers Hill on the south-southwestern shore. By the late 18th century, the pond was considered "a very sink and common sewer".

=== John Fitch's steamboat experiment ===
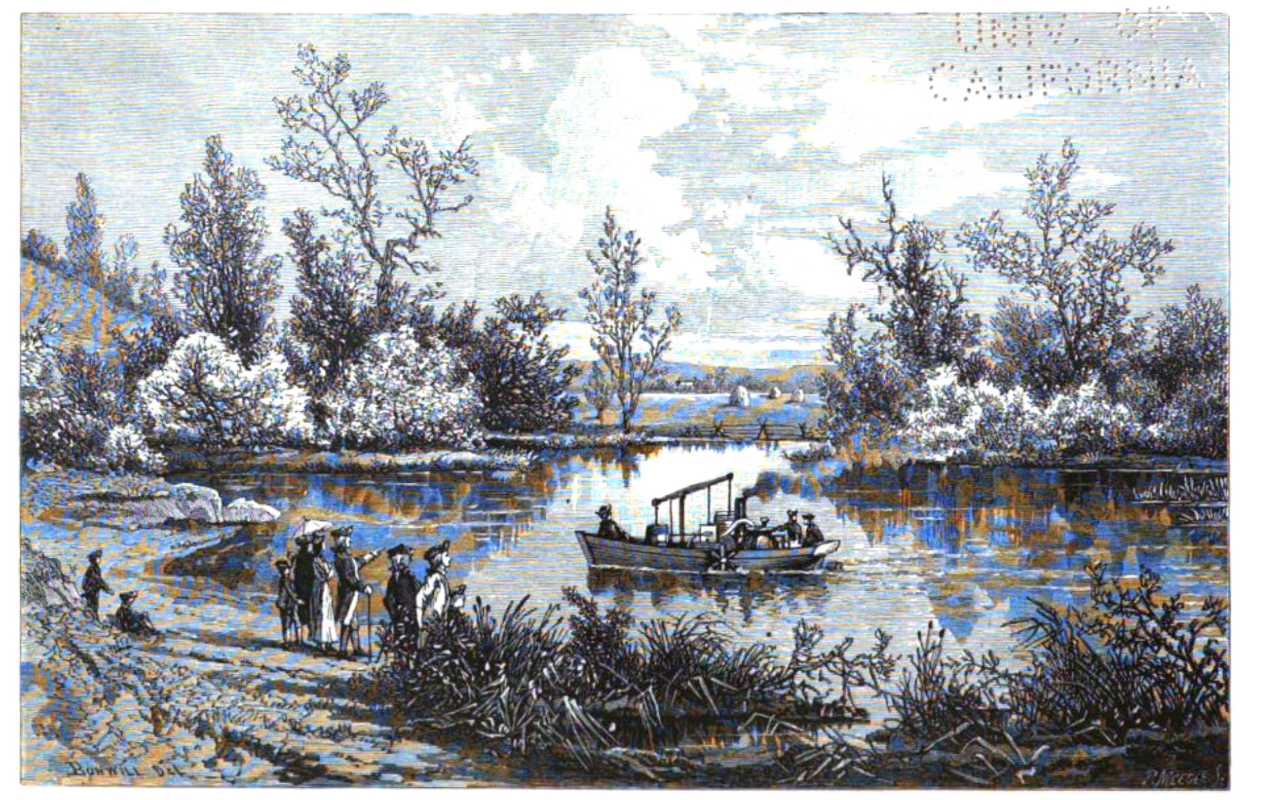
Fitch testing his steamboat on the Collect Pond

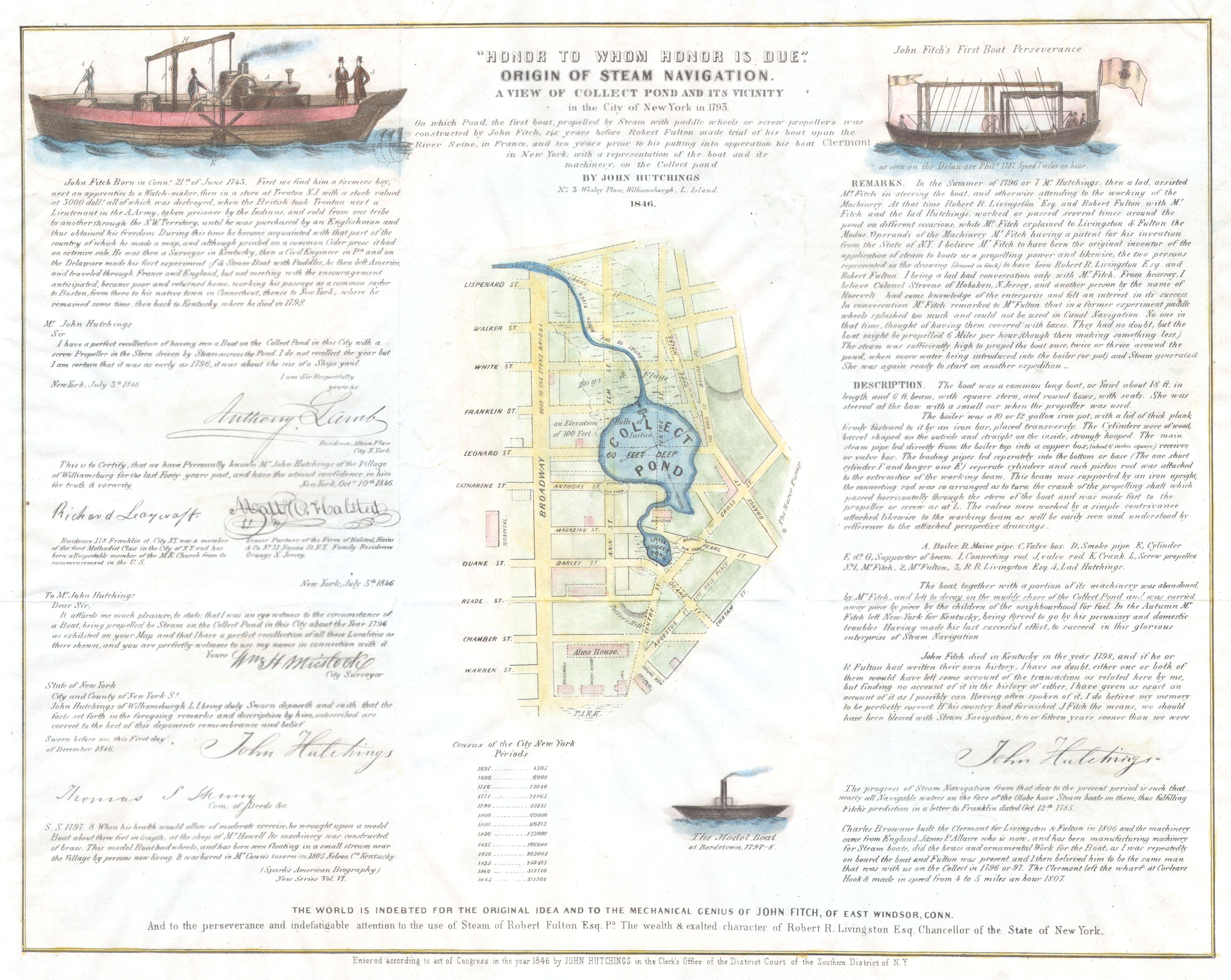
John Fitch's steamboat experiment on Collect Pond

Connecticut inventor John Fitch was an instrument maker working in the later part of the 18th century. As an early pioneer of steam navigation, Fitch tested several steamboats on the Delaware River between 1785 and 1788. Fitch's real success, however, occurred in 1796 when he tested another ship equipped with a paddle wheel on Collect Pond. On the boat with him was fellow inventor Robert Fulton, Robert R. Livingston, who was the first Chancellor of New York and a signer of the Declaration of Independence, and 16-year-old John Hutchings, steering.

This was six years before Fulton and Livingston launched "Fulton's Folly" on the Seine River in France. Hutchings claims to have been a "lad" at the time who "assisted Mr. Fitch in steering the boat". In a broadside issued in 1846, Hutchings asserts that it was in fact Fitch who designed the steam propulsion mechanism. He claims that both Fulton and Livingston were present during Collect Pond tests and in fact depicts both, as well as Fitch and himself, in a paddlewheel steam ship in the upper left quadrant of the broadside. Though Fulton seems to have received most of the credit for the era of steam navigation, Hutchings hoped, through the publication of this broadside, to shed some light on Fitch's contributions as well. A plaque at Collect Pond Park, however, states that though Fitch's account "is often repeated, no evidence has been found to substantiate the story."

== Contamination and landfill ==
The contaminated wastewater of the businesses surrounding the pond flowed back into the pond, creating a severe pollution problem and environmental health hazard. Pierre Charles L'Enfant proposed cleaning the pond and making it a centerpiece of a recreational park, around which the residential areas of the city could grow. His proposal was rejected, and it was decided to drain and fill in the pond. This was accomplished with soil partially obtained from leveling the nearby hills of Bayard's Mount and Kalck Hoek, and by digging a canal to the north to encourage the water to drain into the river. The landfill was completed in 1811, and middle class homes were soon built on the reclaimed land.

The landfill was poorly engineered. The buried vegetation began to release methane gas (a byproduct of decomposition) and the area, still in a natural depression, lacked adequate storm sewers. As a result, the ground gradually subsided. Houses shifted on their foundations, the unpaved streets were often buried in a foot of mud and mixed with human and animal excrement, and mosquitoes bred in the stagnant pools created by the poor drainage.

Several decades later, New York City obtained a new, plentiful supply of fresh water from the Croton Aqueduct. The neighborhood known as "Five Points", a notorious slum, developed near the former eastern bank of the Collect.

Most middle and upper class inhabitants fled the area, leaving the neighborhood open to poor immigrants who began arriving in the early 1820s. This influx reached a height in the 1840s, with large numbers of Irish Catholics fleeing the Great Famine.

== The Tombs ==
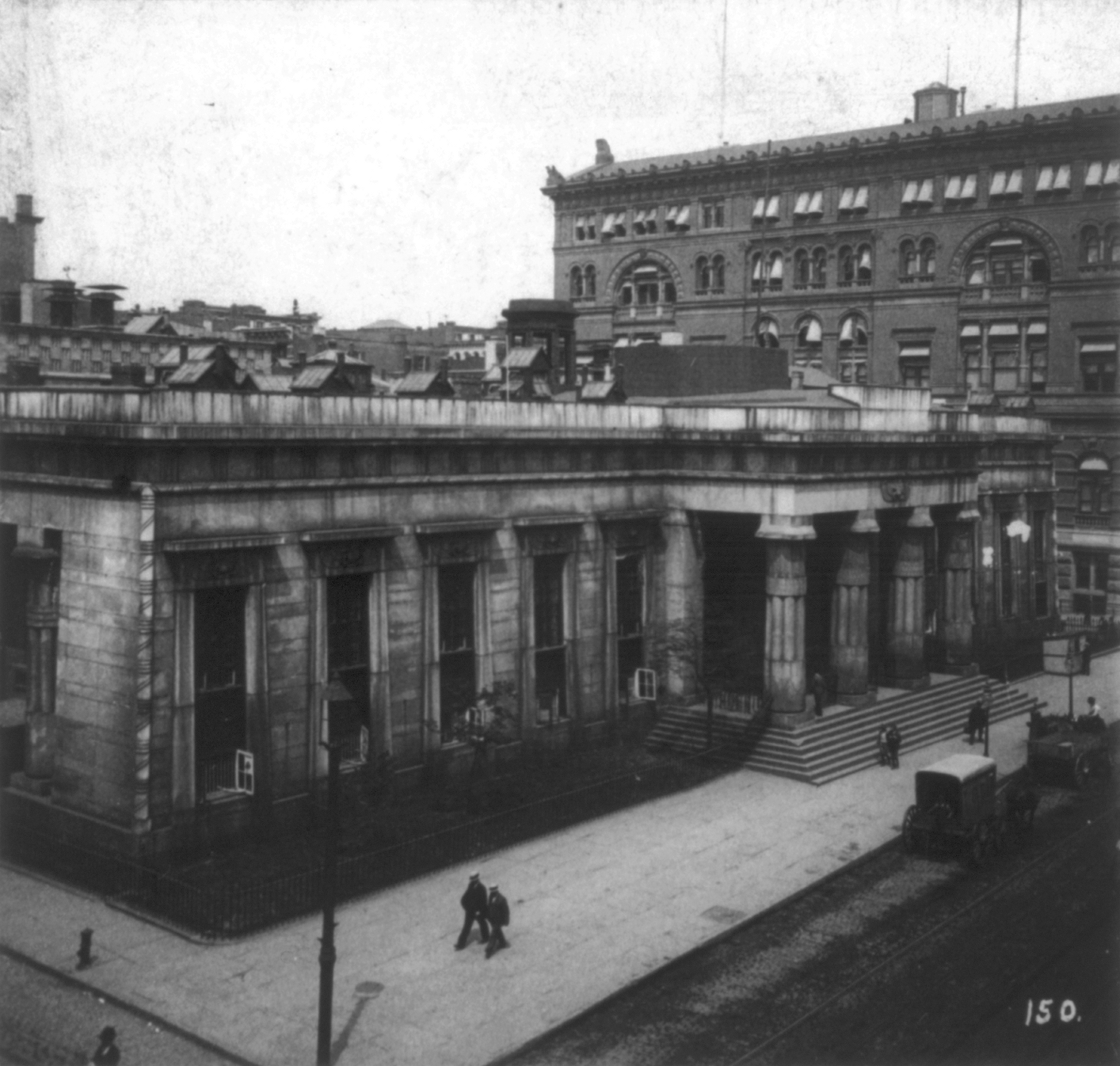
The original Tombs building in 1896

New York's jail, nicknamed "The Tombs", was built on Centre Street in 1838 on the site of the pond and was constructed on a huge platform of hemlock logs in an attempt to give it secure foundations. The design, by John Haviland, was based on an engraving of an ancient Egyptian mausoleum. The building was 253 feet (77 m) in length by 200 feet (61 m) wide and it occupied a full block, surrounded by Centre, Franklin, Elm (today's Lafayette), and Leonard Streets. It initially accommodated about 300 prisoners.

The prison building began to subside almost as soon as it was completed and was notorious for leaks in its lowest tier and for its general dampness. The original building was replaced in 1902 with a new one on the same site connected by a "Bridge of Sighs" to the Criminal Courts Building on the Franklin Street side. When the original Tombs building was condemned and demolished at the end of the century, large concrete caissons were emplaced to bedrock, as much as 140 feet below street level, in order to give its replacement more secure foundations. That building was replaced in 1941 by one across the street on the east side of Centre Street with the entrance at 125 White Street, officially named the Manhattan Detention Complex, though still referred to colloquially as "The Tombs".

== Park conversion ==
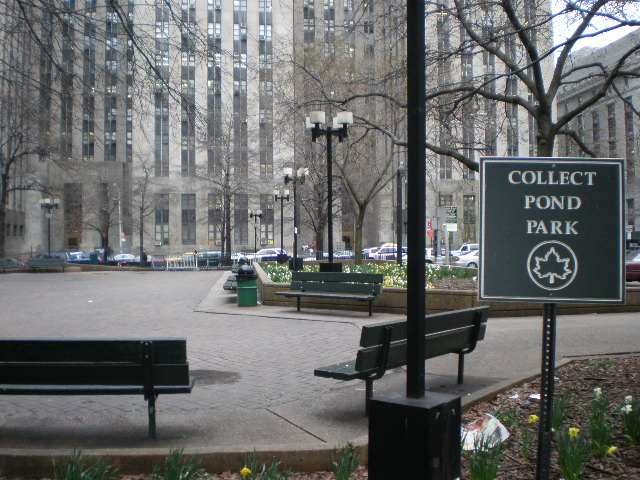
The park in 2008, facing East

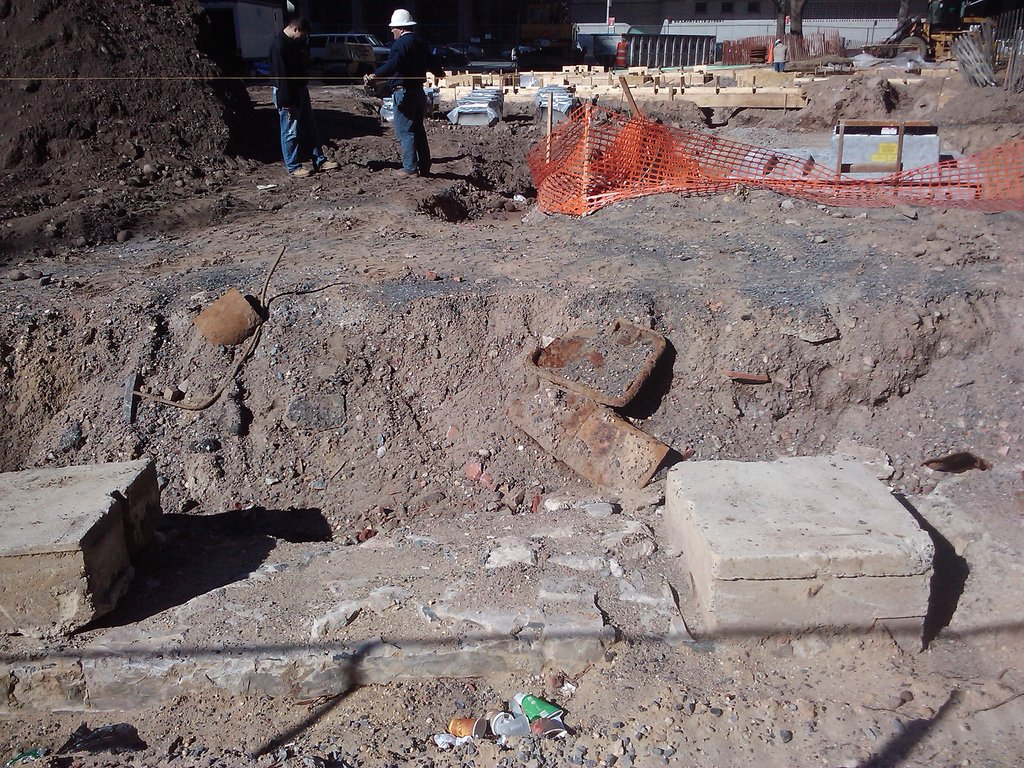
The granite foundation of The Tombs uncovered during reconstruction of Collect Pond Park in early 2012

The park is located on the block bordered by Lafayette Street, Leonard Street, Centre Street, and White Street, and sits between the three city courthouses: the Criminal Court, Civil Court, and Family Court.

In 1960, the New York City Board of Estimate transferred the former site of Collect Pond to the New York City Department of Parks and Recreation for conversion into a park. Originally named "Civil Court Park" because of its proximity to the surrounding courthouses, it was renamed "Collect Pond Park" under Commissioner Henry J. Stern to represent the location's history.

In 2006, the city received funding for a renovation of Collect Pond Park, using federal-relief funds distributed after the September 11 attacks. The park was closed for a total reconstruction in 2011. The granite foundation of The Tombs was uncovered in 2012, leading to a partial stop-work order pending archaeological investigation. The rebuilt park reopened in May 2014, with a pool evocative of the former Collect Pond. The project had cost $4.6 million. Although the park was popular among residents and visitors, the pool had to be drained and repaired within months of the park's reopening; it was refilled in 2015.

It is still possible to ascertain the rough boundaries of Collect Pond and original topography in the elevations of the streets in the area, with the lowest elevation being Centre Street which runs in the approximate center of the former pond.

In 2020, the Italian-Argentine sculptor Luciano Garbati's work Medusa with the Head of Perseus (2008), a seven-foot-tall representation of Medusa carrying Perseus's head, was installed in the center of the park as part of the NYC Parks Department's public art program. Garbati's work, a reversal of Cellini's Perseus with the Head of Medusa, an Italian Renaissance bronze, was reimagined by MeToo movement advocates as a symbol of feminist triumph.
