= Cellini (play) =

2001 play by John Patrick Shanley

Cellini is a 2001 play by American playwright John Patrick Shanley. It is based on the process that the sculptor Benvenuto Cellini went through in order to create his mid-16th century work Perseus with the Head of Medusa.

== Production ==
Shanley said that he had been working on the play for six years, and revised it after it was first staged at Vassar College. He noted that "I think it's a more demanding play than I've ever done before... "

Cellini opened Off-Broadway at the Second Stage Theatre on January 24, 2001 and closed on March 4, 2001. Shanley was the director. The role of Cellini was played by Reg Rogers and its cast of 27 characters was played by only eight actors. Reviews of the play were generally mediocre.
