= Ten Thousand Things =

Minnesota theatre organization

- Formation: 1990
- Founder: Michelle Hensley
- Type: Nonprofit organization
- Artistic Director: Caitlin Lowans
- Managing Director: Stephanie Thompson
- Development and Marketing Director: Amy Tang
- Advancement Manager: Catherine Hennessy Wolter
- Website: https://tenthousandthings.org/

Ten Thousand Things is a theater organization based in the Twin Cities, Minnesota. The organization's mission aims to make theater more accessible, and their touring performances are presented for free at locations such as women's shelters, homeless shelters, prisons, and community and educational centers throughout Minnesota. The organization's artists also work longer-term with some correctional facilities and youth, bringing workshops, residency programs, and classes to audiences. Performances for paying audiences in the Twin Cities are also available and help fund the theater's model.

The productions intentionally have minimal sets and props and no stage lights and are performed in-the-round, which allows the performers to see the audiences and the audiences to see one another. Ten Thousand Things’ founder, Michelle Hensley, discusses the theater's model, history, and impact in her 2015 book, All the Lights On: Reimagining Theater with Ten Thousand Things.

Ten Thousand Things is a member of Theatre Communications Group.

== History ==
Following an initial production of The Good Person of Szechwan by Bertolt Brecht at a homeless shelter in California, Michelle Hensley founded Ten Thousand Things as a nonprofit in 1990. A few years later, Hensley moved to the Twin Cities, where she continued Ten Thousand Things’ work, touring plays to nontraditional venues where audiences often don't have access to theater, prioritizing “big stories” and “fairy tales” that audiences can relate to, and paying actors well to ensure high-quality performances.

In 2018, Michelle Hensley stepped down as artistic director and was succeeded by Marcela Lorca, who had previously served as the Movement Director, as well as a choreographer/director at the Guthrie Theater.

During the COVID-19 pandemic, Ten Thousand Things continued to pay its artists, even for cancelled productions, and found ways to continue to provide artistic offerings. Lorca, in collaboration with playwright Kira Obolensky and Ten Thousand Things’ artists and staff, developed Ten Thousand Voices during the pandemic, a new program facilitating creative writing exercises for audiences, which were then performed by Ten Thousand Things’ actors.

=== Ten Thousand Things Today ===
In 2024, Marcela Lorca stepped down as artistic director and was followed in 2025 by Caitlin Lowans, who was previously the artistic director at Theatreworks Colorado Springs.

Ten Thousand Things continues to build community partnerships, produce free touring performances at nontraditional venues, offer pay-what-you-can performances for paying audiences, and facilitate workshops and residencies in correctional facilities.

== Production history ==
Year	Production	Production	Production
2025-2026	Two Gents	Men on Boats	The Most Happy Fella
2024-2025	Helen	This Girl Laughs, This Girl Cries, This Girl Does Nothing	Violet
2023-2024	Twelfth Night	Ten Thousand Voices: Youth	The Hatmaker's Wife
2023-2024	The Spitfire Grill		
2022-2023	Iphigenia at Aulis	Ten Thousand Voices: Water	Mlima's Tale
2022-2023	Emilia		
2021-2022	The Comedy of Errors	Handprints	Ten Thousand Voices: 2022
2021-2022	Sotto Voce	Thunder Knocking on the Door	
2020-2021	The Fisherman's Wife (Virtual Reading)	The Comedy of Errors (Virtual Reading)	Ten Thousand Voices: 2021
2019-2020	The Winter's Tale	Thunder Knocking on the Door	
2018-2019	Scapin	Into the Woods	The Sins of Sor Juana
2017-2018	Electra	Park and Lake	The Good Person of Szechwan
2016-2017	Pericles	Fiddler on the Roof	Intimate Apparel
2015-2016	Henry IV Part I	Dear World	The Changelings
2014-2015	Romeo and Juliet	The Unsinkable Molly Brown	Forget Me Not When Far Away
2013-2014	A Midsummer Night's Dream	The Music Man	Dirt Sticks
2012-2013	Measure for Measure	The Seven	A Streetcar Named Desire
2011-2012	Il Campiello	As You Like It	Vasa Lisa
2010-2011	Life's a Dream	Doubt, A Parable	Man of La Mancha
2009-2010	Othello	Stones in His Pockets	My Fair Lady
2008-2009	Twelfth Night	Endgame	Raskol
2007-2008	Richard III	Eurydice	Once on this Island
2006-2007	The Merchant of Venice	Blood Wedding	Little Shop of Horrors
2005-2006	Antigone	In a Garden	Red Noses
2004-2005	At Your Service	Iphigenia	Ragtime
2003-2004	The Good Person of Szechwan	A Winter's Tale	Cyrano De Bergerac
2002-2003	King Lear	The Island	Carousel
2001-2002	The Furies	Miss Julie	Anna Bella Eema
2001	Waiting for Godot	The Most Happy Fella	
2000	The Three Lives of Lucie Cabrol	Cymbeline	
1999	The Unsinkable Molly Brown	The Tempest	
1998	The Ballad of the Sad Cafe	Measure for Measure	
1997	Days are Silver Nights are Gold	The Emperor of the Moon	
1996	Mud	The Caucasian Chalk Circle	
1995	The King Stag		
1994	Life's A Dream		
1992	Electra		
1991	The Good Person of Szechwan		

== Impact and awards ==
The model for Ten Thousand Things has been recognized and adopted nationally, including by theater companies such as The Public Theater in New York City, Baltimore Center Stage, Delaware Shakespeare, the Old Globe in San Diego, and California Shakespeare Theater. In 2017, Ten Thousand Things partnered with HowlRound to produce the Ten Thousand Theaters Conference, which invited theaters from across the country to learn more about Ten Thousand Things' model.

Ten Thousand Things has been presented with Ivey Awards, and its productions have received positive reviews from local to regional critics, such as The Minnesota Star Tribune and Talkin’ Broadway. Awards include: Actors’ Equity Association awarded Ten Thousand Things its 2017 Rosetta LeNoire Award for "outstanding artistic contributions to the universality of the human experience in American Theatre." Theatre Communications Group awarded Michelle Hensley its 2018 Visionary Leadership Award. In 2019, MinnPost named Ten Thousand Things' production of The Winter's Tale among the best theater of 2019, The Minnesota Star Tribune named the company's production of Karen Zacarías' The Sins of Sor Juana among the best Twin Cities theater of 2019, and Stage Directors and Choreographers Foundation awarded Marcela Lorca the Zelda Fichandler Award. The organization was recognized on The Minnesota Star Tribune's "best-of" lists for 2022 (for Iphigenia at Aulis), 2024 (for Helen), and 2025 (for Violet).
