= Dewhurst v. Coulthard =

- Supreme Court of the United States

Decided February, 1799
- Full case name: John Dewhurst v. Isaac Coulthard
- Citations: 3 U.S. 409 (more) 3 Dall. 409; 1 L. Ed. 658;

Case history
- Prior: Circuit Court of the N.Y. District

Holding
- Motion denied, held that the Court could not hear a case that was not brought before it by the regular process of law.

Court membership
- Chief Justice Oliver Ellsworth Associate Justices William Cushing · James Iredell; William Paterson · Samuel Chase

Case opinion
- Per curiam

Dewhurst v. Coulthard, 3 U.S. (3 Dall.) 409 (1799), was a United States Supreme Court case that initiated with a civil suit brought by Isaac Coulthard (owner of Coulthard's Brewery) against John Dewhurst which reached the Court by a convoluted process. The Court refused to hear the case: "This court will not take cognizance of any suit, or controversy not brought before them by regular process of law."
