= Thomas Commeraw =

19th century African-American potter and businessman

Thomas W. Commeraw (c. 1772–1823), also known erroneously as Thomas H. Commereau, was an early 19th century Black American potter and businessman. Commeraw operated his pottery workshop in the Corlears Hook area of lower Manhattan in the from the 1790s to 1819. He was a member of the free Black community in Manhattan and was involved in local and national campaigns for abolition of slavery. In 1820 he travelled to Sierra Leone as part of the settlement of the American Colonization Society. He returned to the USA after the death of his wife during a forced relocation in the colony.

His pots are in a number of major collections including the Metropolitan Museum of Art, Brooklyn Museum, National Museum of American History, National Museum of African American History and Culture, and Colonial Williamsburg. In 2024, the New York Historical held the first major solo exhibition about his work: Crafting Freedom: The Life and Legacy of Free Black Potter Thomas W. Commeraw.

Stoneware jug inscribed by Commeraw, Brooklyn Museum.

== Mistaken ethnic identity and name ==
Until 2010 it was presumed that Commeraw was white. Researcher Brandt Zipp confirmed that he was Black, part of the community of approx 7,000 Free Blacks in New York City. In the 1800 U.S. Federal Census he was recorded as "Thomas Commeraw, a Black" as the head of a seven-person household in the 7th Ward.

His ethnic identity was also obscured by the misspelling of his name as Commereau. In 1931 an exhibition of early American pottery presented a “Commeraw Stoneware Jug.” Although the catalogue did not yet reflect the erroneous spelling of “Commereau” that would become popular with later pottery catalogues, such as Ketchum's important record of New York potters, it also did not mention the ethnicity of Commeraw, leaving the reader to assume that he was an American of European ancestry, like the rest of the potters documented in the catalogue. The later misspelling “Commereau,” found copied in the museum records of Winterthur and numerous other institutions, likely stems from an 1800 census that listed “Commeraw /a Black/” living in New York's Seventh Ward. The cursive handwriting could easily be misread as Commereau, sparking a series of authors and museums to first assume a French-African identity, and later a French identity, as the newer sources referred to previous books and lost the original census referent. With only the French name Commereau to go by, it made sense for museums to assume a European identity for the potter who worked in a European style. This simple misspelling shaped the way Commeraw was interpreted and understood for decades.

== Early life ==
Commeraw was born around 1771 in New York City. Enslaved from birth he was manumitted in 1779 when he was around seven years old. Commeraw's family, his parents Tom and Venus and sisters Phyllis and Venus, were enslaved by potter Johan Willem Crolius and the Commeraw family was manumitted in his will. Commeraw may have been trained in the workshops of Crolius on Potbaker's Hill (located near to where New York City Hall is today), although no evidence of his training has survived.

== Career ==
He operated a ceramics business on the Lower East Side waterfront on Corlears Hook. His work was known for its painted blue tassels, scallops, and petals. Commeraw's containers had many uses including holding products including oysters, preserved fruit and alcohol.

In 1819, Cornelius I. Bogert successfully sued Thomas W. Commeraw and his second wife Ann (his first wife Mary had died of dysentery in 1813) in the New York Court of Chancery, the predecessor to the state supreme court. In a series of newspaper articles in the Evening Post in June of that year, the court advertised the auction of two lots of land owned by Commeraw between Cherry Street and Lombardy street, where his pottery kiln and business was located.

In 1820, he left the United States to travel with the American Colonization Society to Sierra Leone. In the new colony, Commeraw was a leader, writing letters back to the Society to report on the state of the project. One of these letters was published in The National Advocate in 1820. The letter describes Sierra Leone as rich and fertile and is ultimately hopeful about the fledgling colony. Nonetheless, the Society maintained control over the colony in a manner that took away some of Commeraw's freedoms. They forced Commeraw and his comrades to move in 1821, believing that the British government may attempt to take the previous site, consisting of valuable farmland, away from the vulnerable colonists. Commeraw lost his wife in the journey, a devastating loss for a man with three young children. In that year, Commeraw wrote another letter to the Society, in which he despaired of the project and feared for his children's moral state. He quickly left, returning to the United States after only two years abroad.

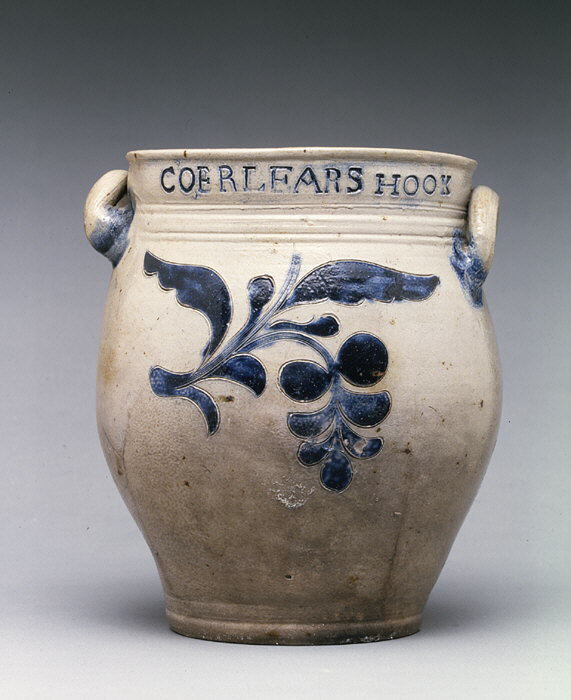
Jar by Commeraw - 1797-1819

Commeraw's works are in the collections of the Metropolitan Museum of Art, Brooklyn Museum, National Museum of American History, Winterthur Museum, New-York Historical Society, Grolier Club, the Baltimore Museum of Art and the New York City Archaeological Repository.

In 2022, Commeraw's work was included in the exhibition Before Yesterday We Could Fly at the Metropolitan Museum of Art. In 2024, the New York Historical held the first single-artist show dedicated to him: Crafting Freedom: The Life and Legacy of Free Black Potter Thomas W. Commeraw.

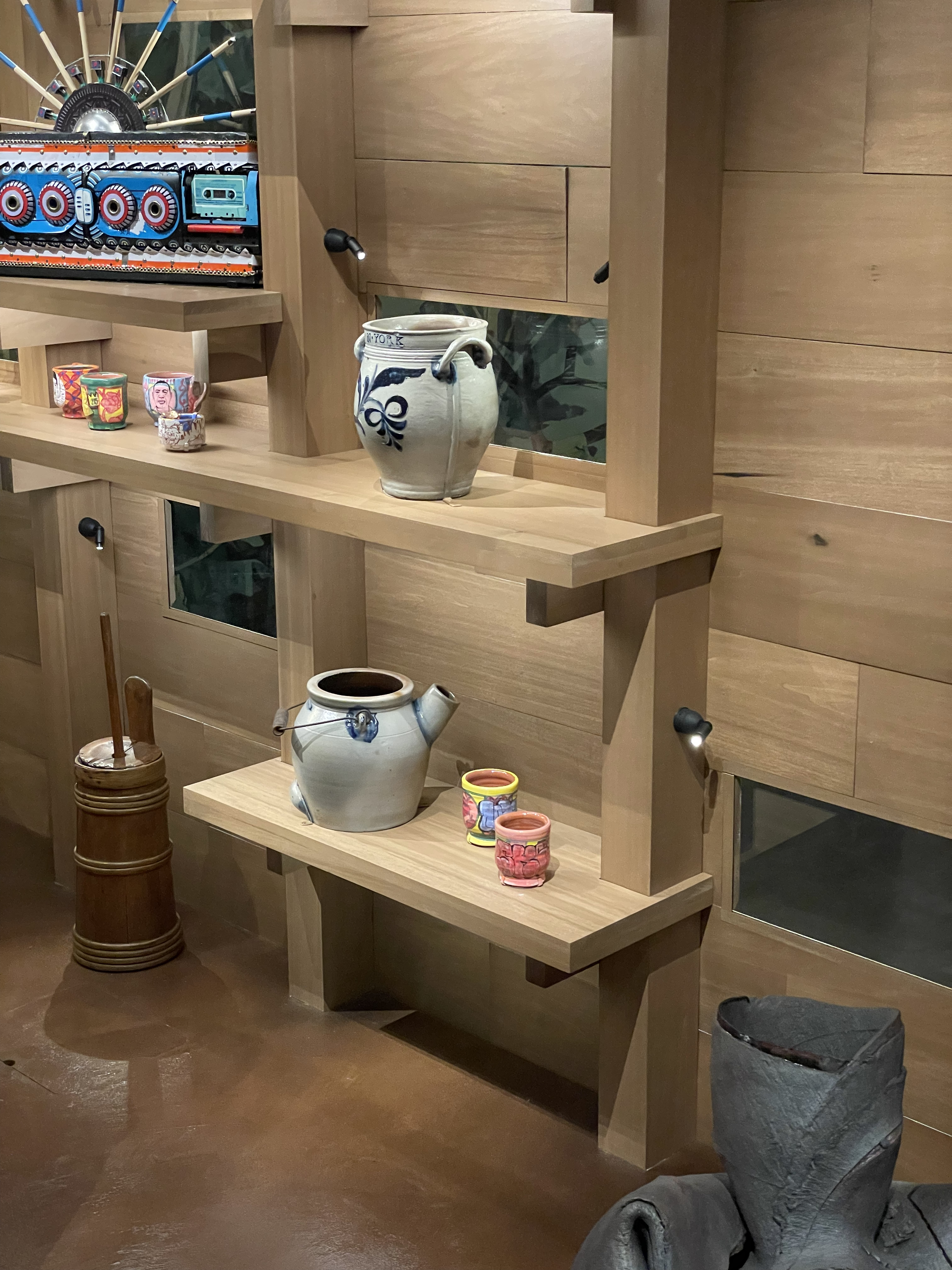
Thomas Commeraw jar (top) at the Before Yesterday We Could Fly show, Met Museum - January, 2022

== Style ==
Commeraw's work is in a German style of stoneware brought to New York by the Crolius and Remmey families. Johan Willem Crolius came to New York from a small town near Westerwald, the center of eighteenth-century German stoneware production. Johannes Remmey came from the same region, and they married sisters, forming an interconnected family of potters that dominated the stoneware production in New York for decades. This family established the first pottery kiln in New York on Pottbaker's Hill. There, they continued the German stoneware tradition of their home country, creating works with a salt-glaze, cobalt blue paint, and incised floral details, just as Commeraw would later create. Crolius's pottery kiln was less than a twenty-minute walk away from the slave market in New York City, providing Crolius with a potential source of inexpensive labor for his workshop. Crolius had at least five enslaved people at the time of his death, but may have had many more. Some of these enslaved individuals would have been used as labor in the pottery business, trained in the German style of pottery that the Remmey-Crolius family was known for. It was common for white contractors to use enslaved people as apprentices. Enslaved individuals trained in a crucial business function were often more valuable than their untrained counterparts, and were not traded and sold as frequently.

Many of his works are inscribed with a location, either N*York (short for New York) or Corlear's Hook, the neighborhood of New York where they were created. Examples of Commeraw's work are also collected by the Metropolitan Museum in New York City and the Smithsonian National Museum of American History. Many more of his jars are sold on the antique market between private collectors. Twenty-three jars attributed to Commeraw were sold by the pottery auction house Crocker's Farm between 2009 and 2017. Of these, only five do not display Commeraw's maker's mark. Three of those five are in Commeraw's style, with the incised floral design characteristic of his early work. The other two are oyster jars made for Dave Johnson, an African-American merchant. The pieces marked by Commeraw as his own are mostly of the storage jar shape.

== Selected exhibitions ==
=== Solo exhibitions ===
- Crafting Freedom: The Life and Legacy of Free Black Potter Thomas W. Commeraw - New York Historical (2023)

=== Group exhibitions ===
- Before Yesterday We Could Fly: An Afrofuturist Period Room - The Metropolitan Museum (2021–present)
- Unnamed Figures: Black Presence and Absence in the Early American North - American Folk Art Museum (2024)

== See also ==
- David Drake
