= The Old Brewery =

Former brewery in Manhattan, New York

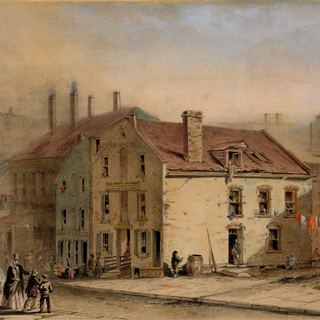
The Old Brewery within the slums of the Five Points, Manhattan, New York City, in a painting before its demolition, circa 1850

The Old Brewery (also known as Coulthard's Brewery) was built in 1792 in the central part of Lower Manhattan, within what is now New York City. Originally on the city's outskirts, it became the neighborhood of Five Points, becoming a tenement rookery following the economic depression of the Panic of 1837.

== Coulthard Brewery ==
The brewery was built by Isaac Coulthard in 1792 southeast of a body of freshwater known as the Collect Pond. The brewery was subsequently involved in a legal case which went to the U.S. Supreme Court in Dewhurst v. Coulthard; the court refused to hear the case, stating that it had not advanced to that level under the normal process of law, establishing firmly the precedent that the court would hear only such cases (3 U.S. 409).

== Five Points Collect Pond filled ==
After a century of being gradually polluted by industries located on its shores, the Collect Pond was filled in, the project being completed around 1811–1812.

== New streets and road construction ==
Afterwards, existing streets were extended and new streets laid out on the reclaimed land. Immediately in front of the brewery passed Cross Street in a northeast to southwest direction. Orange Street intersected Cross just north of the brewery. From this intersection, Anthony Street originated and ran northwest, creating a plot of land which ended in a point. This became the infamous Five Points intersection. To the west of this point ran a short street named Little Water Street, which created a triangular plot known as Paradise Park (also known as Paradise Square); the Brewery was across the street from Paradise Park on the south side of Cross Street.

== Brewery closes ==
Isaac Coulthard died in 1812 and his son William (also a brewer) died in 1822. Afterward, others ran the brewery, including Joseph Barnes in 1827.

== Brewery becomes tenement slum and criminal den ==
After the financial crisis known as the Panic of 1837, Coulthard's Brewery was converted into residential use and became known as "The Old Brewery". Five Points became a slum within a decade after the filling-in of the Collect Pond, and the Old Brewery became a lawless, overcrowded, filthy and disease-ridden building.

The common descriptions are that around the building extended an alley three feet wide, which led to a room called the "Den of Thieves". Seventy-five men, women and children, black and white, made their homes there without furniture or other amenities. Many women were prostitutes and conducted their business there. On the opposite side the passageway was known as Murderers Alley and was all that the name implied. The cellars of the Old Brewery were divided into twenty rooms which had previously been used for storage of machinery and there were about seventy-five other chambers above ground. During its greatest period the building housed over 1,000 men, women and children. According to historian Herbert Asbury, demolition crews found human bones in the cellars and within the walls.

== Demolition and building of Christian mission house ==
The Old Brewery was purchased in 1852 by the Methodist Ladies of the Mission; it was demolished in December 1852 and a new building called the New Mission House at the Five Points was erected. Over forty years later, this mission house would itself be replaced by a newer, even bigger one.

== In popular culture ==
The Old Brewery is depicted in the Martin Scorsese 2002 film Gangs of New York as the Five Points Christian Mission, tenement building, and pauper playhouse. The 2012 video game Assassin's Creed III has the "Boston Brawlers Tournament" in Boston, Massachusetts, within an old brewery modeled after the former Five Points building.

== See also ==
- List of defunct breweries in the United States
