= Lobster Alice =

1999 play by Kira Obolensky

- Promotional poster
- Original language: English
- Written by: Kira Obolensky
- Characters: Alice Horowitz; John Finch; Salvador Dalí; Thorton; The Caterpillar
- Subject: Surrealism, unrequited love, memory and loss
- Genre: Comedy

Premiere
- Date: November 17, 1999
- Place: Playwrights Horizons, New York City

Lobster Alice is a comedic play by Kira Obolensky. Originally premiering Off-Broadway at Playwrights Horizons on November 17, 1999. Directed by Maria Mileaf, the production featured Jessica Hecht, David Patrick Kelly, Derek Richardson, and Reg Rogers.

Lobster Alice won the Kesselring Prize for Playwriting, and was a finalist for the 1999 Susan Smith Blackburn Prize. The play was subsequently included in Women Playwrights: The Best Plays of 1999 anthology, and published/licensed by Concord Theatricals. Lobster Alice has since had numerous regional productions.

The play is loosely inspired by Spanish surrealist painter Salvador Dalí's real life visit to Walt Disney Animation Studios in 1946.

== Characters ==
- Alice Horowitz
- John Finch
- Salvador Dalí
- Thorton
- The Caterpillar

== Plot ==
Lobster Alice is set in 1946 at Walt Disney Animation Studios, where animator John Finch is assigned to supervise a short-term collaboration with Spanish surrealist painter Salvador Dalí. Finch, a reserved and conventional studio employee, is also developing the studio's adaptation Lewis Carroll’s novel Through the Looking-Glass, into a film entitled Alice in Wonderland. Finch harbors romantic feelings for his assistant, Alice Horowitz. Alice, meanwhile, is dissatisfied with the mundane realities of her job, and Finch's inability to express his feelings, and thus longs for a more passionate and adventurous life.

The arrival of Dalí disrupts the orderly routine of the studio. His flamboyant personality and commitment to surrealist principles challenge Finch's cautious approach to both art and relationships, while simultaneously captivating Alice. As Dalí develops increasingly fantastical ideas for the film, the boundaries between reality and imagination begin to blur, and the office setting transforms into a dreamlike landscape influenced by Dalí's imagery and illusions to Alice in Wonderland.

Amid these surreal episodes, tensions rise between Finch and Dalí, fueled by artistic disagreements and romantic jealousy. Alice is captivated by the painters inhibited worldview, inspiring her to reconsider her own desires. The appearance of o ghostly figure from Alice's past further complicates the emotional landscape, deepening the play's exploration of memory, loss, and ineffable longing. Ultimately, Dalí's visit provides a catalyst for change. Through their time with the painter, both Alice and Finch are forced to confront their unexpressed feelings for one another. The play concludes with a tentative reconciliation between the two, as they attempt to move beyond illusion and embrace of more tangible emotional connection.

== Production history ==
=== The Jungle Theater ===
Lobster Alice had its world premiere at the Jungle Theater in Minneapolis, Minnesota in September 1999. Directed by Bain Boehlke, the cast featured Julie Briskman Hall, Bob Davis, Charles Schuminski, and Jamison Haase. The creative team included Boehlke (sets), Amelia Busse Breuer (costumes), Barry Browning (lighting) and C. Andrew Mayer (original music and sound).

=== Playwrights Horizons ===
Lobster Alice had its New York premiere Off-Broadway at Playwrights Horizons, running from November 17, 1999, through January 23, 2000. Directed by Maria Mileaf, the production featured Jessica Hecht, David Patrick Kelly, Derek Richardson, and Reg Rogers. The creative team included Neil Patel (sets), Ann Hould-Ward (costumes), Frances Aronson (lighting) David Van Tieghem (original music and sound), and Jan Hartley (projections).

=== Blank Theatre Company ===
Lobster Alice had its West Coast premiere at Blank Theatre Company in Los Angeles, California, running from July 29, 1999, through September 3, 2006. Directed by Daniel Henning, the production featured Dorie Barton, Noah Wyle, Nicholas Brendon, and Michael Grant Terry. The creative team included Robert Prior (sets and costumes), Jaymi Lee Smith (lighting) Warren Davis (original music and sound), and Judi Lewin (hair and makeup).

== Reception ==
The play's various productions received critical acclaim, with particular praise for Obolensky's script, Mileaf's direction, and the actors performances.

Peter Ritter of Variety praised the play, writing,

"Kira Obolensky's Kesselring Prize-winning comedy is a play about art and lobsters --- or, more precisely, about the juxtaposition of apparently dissonant ideas and the delightful confluence that occasionally results. Lobsters may be as odd a metaphor for creative inspiration as has even been concocted, but like everything in Obolensky's intelligent and splendidly funny play --- which is premiering at the Jungle Theater in Minneapolis --- the plucky crustaceans prove apropos."

Charles McNulty of The Los Angeles Times offered positive sentiments, noting "Only history could be so surreal: In 1946, Salvador Dali spent six weeks at Walt Disney Studios hanging out with a young animator working on Alice in Wonderland. Enticed by this tantalizing footnote in the artist’s biography, playwright Kira Obolensky invents a theatrical dream world in which the man who famously envisioned melting clocks helps (in his signature boundary-blurring way) a reluctant couple melt into each other. Not surprisingly, Lobster Alice is an invitation for the most delightful visual whimsy."

In a more mixed review, Ben Brantley of The New York Times praised Hecht's performance and Mileaf's direction, while criticizing the script, writing "Jessica Hecht plays a Hollywood secretary named Alice Horowitz whose life is turned inside out by an encounter with Salvador Dali in 1946. She is also the principal reason to be of this show, which has been staged by Maria Mileaf with a level of insight and visual sophistication that the script itself rarely lives up to."

== Awards ==
| Year | Award | Recipient | Result | Ref. |
|---|---|---|---|---|
| 1998 | Kesselring Prize for Playwriting | Kira Obolensky | Won | |
| 1999 | Susan Smith Blackburn Prize | Kira Obolensky | Nominated | |
