= The Neverything =

The Neverything is a series of short films directed by Kirt Gunn, released on the internet and sponsored by Mercury. It was also the working title for a full-length feature film based on the shorts, which was later released as Lovely By Surprise.

== Synopsis of plot ==
The film is about two brothers, Humkin and Mopekey, who live on a boat; the boat sits on land and is isolated in the middle of a field in some unspecified part of America. The two brothers live a solitary existence; they are clothed only in underwear, and have no communication with the outside world, with the exception of a few signals received through the ship's radio. Their sustenance takes the form of milk which is delivered by an equally mysterious milkman and a cereal consisting of frosted sugar balls; the origin of the food is not made clear.

== Feature Film ==
Kirt Gunn directed a full-length feature film based on both the episodes comprising The Neverything, as well as the episodes of a parallel series of shorts titled Lovely By Surprise which followed the author of the brothers' fictional world. Originally advertised with the title The Neverything, the feature was re-titled Lovely By Surprise before its release.

== Sponsorship ==
The production, promotion and release of the film is significantly tied to commercial promotion; "The Neverything" was made under the provision of Mercury, a division of Ford Motor Company, and Mercury is using its broadcast of the "webisodes" as an alternative to traditional marketing channels.
