= Medusa with the Head of Perseus =

2008 Sculpture by Luciano Garbati

Medusa with the Head of Perseus is a sculpture created by Luciano Garbati in 2008. The statue depicts Medusa holding a sword and the head of Perseus, a role reversal of Greek legend. A bronze cast version was displayed in Collect Pond Park, Lower Manhattan from October 2020 to April 2021.

Although it was not created as a feminist work, it was later adopted as a symbol by some in the Me Too movement.

== Creation and description ==
The sculpture depicts a nude Medusa holding the head of Perseus in her right hand and a sword in her left. The original Medusa was sculpted in clay, then cast in resin with fibreglass reinforcements. The sculpture stands just over 2 metres tall.

Garbati grew up in a small town near Florence, where Benvenuto Cellini's Perseus with the Head of Medusa is prominently displayed in the Loggia Lanzi of the Piazza della Signoria; he admired Cellini's work, and wanted to reverse the roles of the narrative. In an interview with Quartz, he drew the distinction between Cellini's Perseus and his Medusa; in the former Perseus is triumphant, while in the latter Medusa is determined, and had acted in self defense. He would later state that he was unaware of Medusa's status as a feminist icon at the time.

== In New York City ==
A photograph of Medusa, captioned "Be thankful we only want equality and not payback", went viral on social media in 2018. This image was seen by New York photographer Bek Andersen, who quickly got into contact with an anonymous patron of the arts. Medusa was the centerpiece of Medusa With The Head, a pop-up exhibition in the Bowery that ran from November 2018 to January 2019.

Andersen and Garbati later collaborated on an application to New York City's Art in the Parks program. A bronze replica of Medusa was installed in Collect Pond Park, facing the New York County Criminal Court building. Some have drawn comparison between Medusa and the Harvey Weinstein sexual assault trial, which took place at the New York County Criminal Court.
