= Lovely by Surprise =

Lovely By Surprise
- Promotional poster
- Directed by: Kirt Gunn
- Written by: Kirt Gunn
- Starring: Carrie Preston; Michael Chernus; Austin Pendleton; Dallas Roberts; Reg Rogers; Kate Burton; Richard Masur
- Cinematography: Steve Yedlin
- Music by: Shelby Bryant
- Release date: 2007
- Running time: 100 minutes
- Country: United States
- Language: English

Lovely By Surprise is a 2007 film directed by Kirt Gunn. It stars Carrie Preston, Michael Chernus, Austin Pendleton and Reg Rogers.

== Plot ==
Facing an intense bout of writer's block, novelist Marian Walker (Carrie Preston) seeks advice from her mentor and ex-lover (Austin Pendleton). He gives her some innocent advice: kill off Humkin (Michael Chernus), the book's protagonist. Marian tries to write the death scene, but this proves complicated: Humkin survives, escapes, and starts to appear outside of the confines of the story.

== Promotional webisodes ==
In 2006 two websites, Lovely By Surprise and The Neverything, were launched as teasers for the film. Each website told a different strand of the film's story through one-minute "webisode" installments over a period of weeks.
