= Sabina Zimering =

Polish-American ophthalmologist and memoirist (1923–2021)

- Zimering in 2019
- Born: Sabina Szwarc; February 24, 1923; Piotrków Trybunalski, Poland
- Died: September 6, 2021 (aged 98); St. Louis Park, Minnesota, U.S.
- Occupations: Ophthalmologist, memoirist
- Spouse: Ruben Zimering (m. 1950; died 2012)
- Children: 3

Sabina Zimering (née Szwarc; February 24, 1923 – September 6, 2021) was a Polish-American ophthalmologist and memoirist known for sharing her experiences during the Holocaust. Born in Poland, she survived the Holocaust living in Germany under an assumed identity as a Catholic Pole. After the war, she resumed her studies and earned a medical degree at Munich Medical College, one of the only women and Jewish students to do so. She immigrated to the United States to join what family remained after the Holocaust, and practiced ophthalmology. In 2001, she published her memoirs, Hiding in the Open: A Holocaust Memoir, which has twice been adapted as a play.

== Early life ==
Sabina Szwarc was born February 24, 1923, to a Polish Jewish family. She had a sister, Helka, and brother, Nathan. They lived in Piotrków Trybunalski. The family spoke both Yiddish and Polish in the home and attended synagogue and celebrated holidays, but did not keep kosher, a source of conflict with Sabina's Orthodox grandparents. Her father had a small coal business that struggled in the 1930s' depression, but an autodidact, he spent Saturdays taking his daughters for pastries and reading the cafes' free copies of Yiddish and Polish newspapers. Her mother was an educated woman from an affluent Russian family, and both parents placed great emphasis on education. They had opposing politics, however, as Sabina's father was a socialist who hoped a reformed Poland would be a safe homeland for its Jewish residents, while her mother was more Zionist, feeling his confidence was misplaced and Jews needed to seek safety in Israel.

Sabina initially attended a Polish public school and though Jewish students were exempted from Catholic theology lessons, she was bored by the free time and joined her classmates studying the catechism, which proved useful knowledge later on. She next enrolled in a private Jewish gymnasium as her mother, despite the expense, insisted on giving her an education similar to what she had received; she graduated at 16 shortly prior to the invasion of Poland in 1939.

=== During the Holocaust ===
That year the Szwarcs were sent to the Piotrków Trybunalski Ghetto. Szwarc's family friend and former schoolteacher, Kazimiera Justyna, a Roman Catholic, provided Szwarc's family with her own identification paper and those of her daughters, Danka and Mala Justyna. This allowed Szwarc, her sister, Helka, and her mother to masquerade as Catholic Poles and escape to Germany. The sisters worked as maids at hotels frequented by Nazi officers, including the Maximilian Hotel in Munich for three years. Kazimiera, Danka and Mala Justyna were caught as members of the Polish resistance. The mother was sent to a concentration camp and a daughter was almost executed. Szwarc's brother, Nathan, survived Buchenwald concentration camp but witnessed their father die two days before liberation. Her mother was murdered in a gas chamber at the Treblinka extermination camp. In total, of 50 to 60 extended family members, seven survived.

Szwarc had not been especially religious before the war, and was even less so after, asking, "if there was a God, where was he?"

== Career ==
After the war, Szwarc traded in her Polish identification papers to restore her identity and with American support, she and her sister got an apartment in Regensburg. An opportunity arose to resume her education and she soon relocated to Munich, becoming one of a few women and Jews to attend Munich Medical School, completing her M.D. in 1950. For Szwarc, as with other Jewish student survivors, the postwar years were marked with what historian Jeremy Varon called "liberating abandon", with outdoor adventures, canoeing and scaling mountains, and participating in the broader trend of reappropriating former Nazi sites of note, for instance with student trips to Adolf Hitler's former compound at Berchtesgaden, gleeful to be alive and now occupying the hotel rooms that had so recently hosted Gestapo and top Nazi generals. Szwarc also dealt with isolation and antisemitism at school, with just a few Jewish students enrolled among Germans who at times demonstrated resentment toward them.

After immigrating to the United States, she learned English and earned a Minnesota medical license. She married Rueben Zimering and took the license exam on the due date of their first child. She worked part-time at the University of Minnesota Student Health Service for ten years. After her children became old enough to attend school, she worked there fulltime as an ophthalmologist for another ten years.

Zimering opened her own ophthalmology practice where her proficiency in the Polish language was useful when treating Eastern European patients. Zimering was a medical practitioner for 42 years. She retired in 1996.

In her 70s, Zimering became a memoirist and traveled the United States to speak about the Holocaust. At the insistence of her family, Zimering authored the book, Hiding in the Open: A Holocaust Memoir. North Star Press of St. Cloud. 2001. ISBN 978-0-87839-171-4. The memoir was adapted to a play in 2004 by Hayley Finn and in 2010 by playwright Kira Obolensky.

== Personal life ==
Szwarc immigrated to Minnesota in 1949 to join her siblings. In 1950, she married her former medical school classmate, Rueben Zimering. The Zimerings lived in Minneapolis. They had six children. Rueben died in 2012.

Zimering lived in St. Louis Park, Minnesota. One of the Polish Catholic daughters who allowed her to use her identification papers was jailed after the war for allegedly being anti-communist. Zimering sent her medication for tuberculosis and advocated for her release from jail.

In 1979, Zimering's Adath Jeshurun Synagogue honored the Polish sisters for risking their lives to save Zimering's family.

In 2011, Zimering visited Poland to show her two daughters her life during the Holocaust. She died in her sleep on September 6, 2021, in her St. Louis Park home.
