= The Photographer (2000 film) =

2000 American comedy film

- DVD cover for The Photographer
- Directed by: Jeremy Stein
- Written by: Jeremy Stein
- Produced by: Peter O. Almond; Stefan Frank; Marco Londoner; Per Melita; Chris Moore; Jeremy Stein
- Starring: Reg Rogers; Anthony Michael Hall; Maggie Gyllenhaal
- Cinematography: Vanja Cernjul
- Edited by: Sylvia Waliga
- Music by: Andrew Hollander
- Release date: April 2000 (Taos Talking Picture Festival)
- Running time: 91 minutes
- Country: United States
- Language: English

The Photographer is a 2000 American comedy film directed by Jeremy Stein. It revolves around a photographer who has a single evening to find 10 magical photographs, or else he stands to lose everything that is important to him.

== Plot ==
A year after becoming the toast of New York City's art scene, photographer Max Martin has lost his ability to take a decent picture. On the night before his make-or-break gallery opening, surrounded by the trappings of success, but devoid of inspiration, Max embarks on a bizarre trek through the city in search of 10 mysterious photographs that could save his career. Accompanied by an unlikely crew of strangers he meets along the way, Max trips through a modern-day Oz, and rediscovers the easily forgotten value of seeing magic reflected in everyday life.

== Cast ==
A number of notable members of the New York independent film scene made appearances in the movie.

- Reg Rogers as Max Martin
- Tina Holmes as Amy
- Anthony Michael Hall as Greg
- Marisa Berenson as Julie Morris
- Kristen Wilson as Schuyler
- Fenton Lawless as The Bartender
- Richard Bright as Drunk In Bar
- Tom Noonan as Butler
- Josh Stamberg as Peter Morgan
- Alex Draper as Nelson Stanley
- John Heard as Marcello
- Rob Campbell as Romeo
- Michael Shannon as Maurice
- Maggie Gyllenhaal as Mira
- Leslie Lyles as Zora
- Chris Bauer as Paul
- Siobhan Fallon as Crazy Lady
- Missy Yager as Judy
- Miles Chapin as Steve
- Mary Alice as Violet
- Ritchie Coster as Attacker #1
