= Reg Rogers =

American actor (born 1964)

- Born: Reg Rogers; December 23, 1964 (age 61); Los Angeles, California, U.S.
- Occupation: Actor
- Years active: 1994–present
- Spouse: Susannah Rogers (m. 2008)

Reg Rogers (born December 23, 1964) is an American stage, film, and television actor, known for his roles in Primal Fear and Runaway Bride and for the TV miniseries Attila. He also appears in theater, both on Broadway and Off-Broadway.

== Early life ==
Rogers was raised in Newport Beach, California. After high school, he attended several colleges before graduating from the Yale School of Drama in 1993.

== Career ==
Rogers has frequently appeared in guest roles on television shows including Law & Order, CSI: Crime Scene Investigation, Friends, The Closer, Boardwalk Empire, Touched by an Angel, The Knick, Lipstick Jungle, Miss Match, Hell on Wheels, The Americans, The Blacklist and the TV miniseries Attila. He played the killer Andrew Lincoln in the 2005 TV film Stone Cold, part of the Jesse Stone TV film series.

Films that featured Rogers include Primal Fear, I Shot Andy Warhol, Runaway Bride, The Photographer, Analyze That, Igby Goes Down, and Lovely by Surprise.

=== Theater ===
Rogers was nominated for the 1996 Tony Award for Best Featured Actor in a Play and the 1996 Drama Desk Award for Outstanding Featured Actor in a Play for a Broadway revival of Philip Barry's Holiday. He won the 2002 Obie Award as Outstanding Actor for his role in Richard Greenberg's Off-Broadway play The Dazzle.

In May 2005, he costarred with Marin Hinkle in the Craig Lucas adaptation of August Strindberg's Miss Julie at Rattlestick Playwrights Theater.

In 2011, he performed in two plays at Shakespeare in the Park in New York City: Measure for Measure and All's Well That Ends Well. In September 2011 he appeared in the new Theresa Rebeck play Poor Behavior at the Mark Taper Forum, Los Angeles.

In August 2013, Rogers costarred with Johanna Day in the world premiere of Carly Mensch’s play Oblivion at the Westport Country Playhouse.

In the 2014 Broadway production of You Can't Take It with You, he played Boris Kolenkhov, the Russian refugee and dance teacher.

In March 2017, he began performing as Morris Dixon in the Broadway production of Present Laughter starring Kevin Kline.

In September 2018, he originated the role of Ron Carlisle in Tootsie, which moved to Broadway in March 2019.

Rogers played the part of Joe Josephson in the 2022 Off-Broadway revival of Merrily We Roll Along, which transferred to the Hudson Theatre as the first Broadway revival of the show in September 2023.

In December 2024, he took over the role of Mr Mushnik in the Off-Broadway revival of Little Shop of Horrors replacing Stephen DeRosa.

== Filmography ==
=== Film ===
| Year | Film | Role | Note(s) |
|---|---|---|---|
| 1996 | I Shot Andy Warhol | Paul Morrissey | |
| 1996 | Primal Fear | Jack Connerman | |
| 1997 | The End of Violence | Jack | |
| 1997 | 'Til There Was You | Bob | |
| 1999 | Jump | Gordon | |
| 1999 | Runaway Bride | George "Big Guy" Swilling | |
| 1999 | I'll Take You There | Bill | |
| 2000 | The Photographer | Max Martin | |
| 2001 | Get Well Soon | Keith Charles | |
| 2002 | Igby Goes Down | Therapist | |
| 2002 | Analyze That | Raoul Berman | |
| 2006 | The Wedding Weekend | Richard | |
| 2007 | Chicago 10 | Tom Hayden, Unidentified Yippie, Marshal 3 | Voice role |
| 2007 | Lovely by Surprise | Bob | |
| 2008 | The Guitar | Brett | |
| 2013 | Last Time We Checked | Himself | Short |
| 2013 | El cielo es azul | Man | |
| 2014 | Elsa & Fred | Alec | |
| 2014 | Little Girl Blue | Amos | Short |
| 2025 | Merrily We Roll Along | Joe Josephson | Filmed production |

=== Television ===
| Year | Show | Role | Note(s) |
|---|---|---|---|
| 1994–2010 | Law & Order | Joshua Felner, Edgar Varick, Jason Bregman | 3 episodes |
| 1997 | Chicago Hope | Elks Williams | Episode: "The Day Of The Rope" |
| 1997 | Friends | The Director | 3 episodes |
| 1998 | Touched by an Angel | John Wilkes Booth | Episode: "Beautiful Dreamer" |
| 2001 | Attila | Valentinian | Miniseries; 2 episodes |
| 2003 | Ed | Ted | 2 episodes |
| 2003 | Miss Match | Richard Lonneman | 2 episodes |
| 2005 | Eyes | Danny Agermeyer | Episode: "Pilot" |
| 2005 | Jesse Stone: Stone Cold | Andrew Lincoln | TV movie |
| 2005 | Uncommon Sense | Himself | TV movie |
| 2006 | If You Lived Here, You'd Be Home By Now | Curtis | TV movie |
| 2007 | Law & Order: Criminal Intent | Dr. James Corliss | Episode: "Brother's Keepers" |
| 2007 | Them | Ezekial Smits | TV movie |
| 2008 | Lipstick Jungle | Stephen Draper | Episode: "Chapter Seventeen: Bye, Bye Baby" |
| 2009 | CSI: Crime Scene Investigation | Jonathan Danson | Episode: "A Space Oddity" |
| 2010 | Scoundrels | Sparky | Episode: "Yes, Sir, Yes, Sir, Three Bags Full" |
| 2011 | Georgetown | Len Foster | TV movie |
| 2012 | The Closer | Jerry Cooper | Episode: "Fool's Gold" |
| 2012 | Blue Bloods | Vance Bradley | Episode: "Greener Grass" |
| 2012 | Elementary | Micah Elrich | Episode: "The Leviathan" |
| 2013–15 | The Americans | Charles Duluth | 4 episodes |
| 2014 | The Good Wife | Asher Mercer | Episode: "A Material World" |
| 2014 | Boardwalk Empire | Robert Hodge | 2 episodes |
| 2014–15 | The Knick | Dr. Bertram Checkering Sr. | 7 episodes |
| 2015 | Flesh and Bone | Jasper | Miniseries; 3 episodes |
| 2015–16 | Hell on Wheels | James Strobridge | 8 episodes |
| 2016 | Turn: Washington's Spies | Randall, Joseph Reed | 4 episodes |
| 2016 | Bull | Freddy Bensimon | Episode: "The Necklace" |
| 2017 | Mercy Street | | Episode: "The House Guest" |
| 2017 | Great Performances | Morris Dixon | Episode: "Present Laughter" |
| 2018 | Law & Order: Special Victims Unit | Carl Fleming | Episode: "Flight Risk" |
| 2018 | Instinct | Russ Mosher | Episode: "Live" |
| 2018 | You | Professor Paul Leary | 2 episodes |
| 2019 | The Code | Dennis Swillice | Episode: "Molly Marine" |
| 2019–20 | NOS4A2 | Abe | 2 episodes |
| 2021 | The Blacklist | Neville Townsend | 12 episodes |
| 2024 | Evil | Aiden Flowers | 2 episodes |

=== Stage ===
| Year | Title | Role | Notes |
|---|---|---|---|
| 1992 | The Beauty Part | Hagedorn/Chenille Schreiber | Yale Repertory Theatre |
| 1992 | The Taming of the Shrew | Gremio | Shakespeare Santa Cruz |
| 1992 | Hamlet | Francisco/Lucianus | Yale Repertory Theatre |
| 1993 | Four Dogs and a Bone | Victor | Lucille Lortel Theatre, Off-Broadway |
| 1994 | The Seagull | Konstantine Gavrilovich Treplyev | Williamstown Theatre Festival |
| 1994 | Figaro/Figaro | Figaro | Yale Repertory Theatre |
| 1995 | The Molière Comedies | Gros-René/Sganarelle | Criterion Center Stage Right, Broadway |
| 1995 | Holiday | Ned Seton | Circle in the Square Theatre, Broadway |
| 1995 | The Tempest | Stephano | Shakespeare Santa Cruz |
| 1995 | King Lear | Edmund | Shakespeare Santa Cruz |
| 1996 | Rocket to the Moon | Ben Stark | Williamstown Theatre Festival |
| 1996 | Dealer's Choice | Mugsy | Long Wharf Theatre |
| 1996 | Landscape of the Body | Captain Marvin Holahan | Yale Repertory Theatre |
| 1996 | The Lover | Dmitri Insarov | Baltimore Center Stage |
| 1997 | Proposals | Ken Norman | Broadhurst Theatre, Broadway |
| 1999 | Look Back in Anger | Jimmy | Classic Stage Company, Off-Broadway |
| 1999 | Lobster Alice | John Finch | Playwrights Horizons, Off-Broadway |
| 2001 | Cellini | Cellini | Second Stage Theater, Off-Broadway |
| 2001 | Unwrap Your Candy | The Doctor | Vineyard Theatre, Off-Broadway |
| 2002 | The Dazzle | Langley | Gramercy Theatre, Off-Broadway |
| 2003 | The Chekhov Cycle | Captain Bassily Solyony/Simon Epihodov/Constantine Trepleff | Williamstown Theatre Festival |
| 2003 | Little Shop of Horrors | Orin Scrivello | Actors' Playhouse at the Miracle Theatre |
| 2004 | Can-Can | Boris Adzinidzinadze | New York City Center, Off-Broadway |
| 2005 | Miss Julie | Jean | Rattlestick Playwrights Theater, Off-Broadway |
| 2005 | Bach at Leipzig | Lenck | New York Theatre Workshop, Off-Broadway |
| 2006 | Ridiculous Fraud | Andrew Clay | McCarter Theatre |
| 2006 | The Pain and the Itch | Cash | Playwrights Horizons, Off-Broadway |
| 2007 | The Injured Party | Seth | South Coast Repertory |
| 2007 | Richard III | Richard III | California Shakespeare Theater |
| 2008 | The Understudy | Harry | Williamstown Theatre Festival |
| 2008 | Rough Crossing | Turai | Yale Repertory Theatre |
| 2009 | The Royal Family | Tony Cavendish | Samuel J. Friedman Theatre, Broadway |
| 2009 | Knickerbocker | Jerry | Williamstown Theatre Festival |
| 2010 | A Free Man of Color | Tallyrand/Zeus-Marie Pincepousse | Vivian Beaumont Theater, Broadway |
| 2010 | Romance | The Defense Attorney | Bay Street Theatre, Off-Broadway |
| 2011 | Measure for Measure | Lucio | Shakespeare in the Park, Off-Broadway |
| 2011 | All's Well That Ends Well | Parolles | Shakespeare in the Park, Off-Broadway |
| 2011 | Poor Behavior | Ian | Mark Taper Forum |
| 2012 | Glengarry Glen Ross | Ricky Roma | Gate Theatre |
| 2013 | Oblivion | Dixon | Westport Country Playhouse |
| 2013 | The Big Knife | Smiley Coy | American Airlines Theatre, Broadway |
| 2014 | You Can't Take It with You | Boris Kolenkhov | Longacre Theatre, Broadway |
| 2016 | Privacy | Josh Cohen | The Public Theater, Off-Broadway |
| 2017 | Present Laughter | Morris Dixon | St. James Theatre, Broadway |
| 2017 | An Enemy of the People | Dr. Thomas Stockmann | Yale Repertory Theatre |
| 2018 | The Iceman Cometh | Jimmy Tomorrow | Bernard B. Jacobs Theatre, Broadway |
| 2019 | Tootsie | Ron Carlisle | Marquis Theatre, Broadway |
| 2021 | The Alchemist | Subtle | Red Bull Theater Company, Off-Broadway |
| 2022 | Murder on the Orient Express | Hercule Poirot | Cape Playhouse |
| 2022 | Merrily We Roll Along | Joe Josephson | New York Theatre Workshop, Off-Broadway |
| 2023 | Dial M For Murder | Inspector Hubbard | Bay Street Theatre, Off-Broadway |
| 2023 | Merrily We Roll Along | Joe Josephson | Hudson Theatre, Broadway |
| 2026 | Rhinoceros | Berenger | Yale Repertory Theatre |
| 2026 | Little Shop of Horrors | Mushnik | Westside Theatre, Off-Broadway |

=== Video games ===
| Year | Game | Role | Note(s) |
|---|---|---|---|
| 2007 | Manhunt 2 | The Legion | Voice role |
| 2017 | Sniper: Ghost Warrior 3 | Additional Voices | Voice role |
