= Kira Obolensky =

American playwright and author

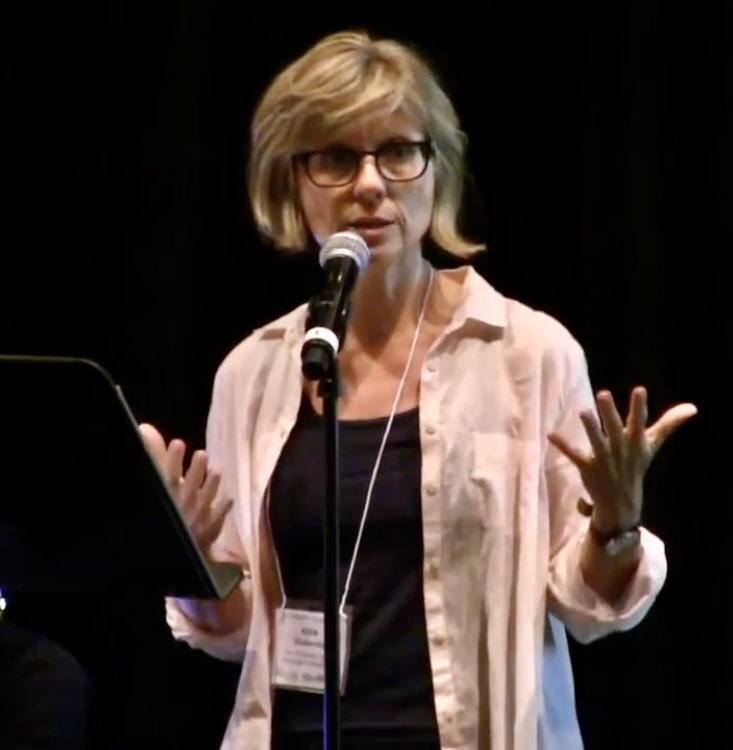
- Obolensky in 2016
- Born: New York, U.S.
- Education: Williams College (BA); Juilliard School (GrDip); Warren Wilson College (MFA)
- Occupations: Playwright, author
- Writing career
- Notable awards: Guggenheim Fellowship (1997)

Kira Obolensky is an American playwright and author based in Minneapolis. She was awarded a Guggenheim Fellowship in 1997 in the field of drama and performance art. She won a Bush Foundation artist's fellowship in 1999.

== Life ==
Obolensky was born in New York to a Russian father and an Australian mother. She has two younger sisters. Obolensky was raised in Texas and New Orleans. She completed a degree at Williams College.

Obolensky adapted Holocaust survivor Sabina Zimering's memoir into a play in 2010.

Obolensky lives in South Minneapolis and is married to sculptor Irve Dell.

== Selected works ==
- Susanka, Sarah; Obolensky, Kira (1998). The Not So Big House: A Blueprint for the Way We Really Live. Taunton Press. ISBN 1-56158-130-5.
- Obolensky, Kira (2001). Garage: Reinventing the Place We Park. Taunton Press. ISBN 978-1-56158-378-2.
- Obolensky, Kira (2002-09-10). Lobster Alice: A Comedy. Playscripts, Incorporated. ISBN 978-1-62384-350-2.
- Corbett, Bill; Obolensky, Kira (2004). Hate Mail: A Comedy. Playscripts, Incorporated. ISBN 978-1-62384-049-5.
- Obolensky, Kira (2005). Good House, Cheap House: Adventures in Creating an Extraordinary Home at an Ordinary Price. Taunton Press. ISBN 978-1-56158-752-0.
