= Johan Willem Crolius =

German-born New York potter

- Born: c. 1718; Neuwied, Westerwald
- Died: 1779 (aged 60–61)
- Other name: William Crolius
- Spouse: Veronica Cortselius (m. 1724)

Johan Willem Crolius (died 1779) , also known as William Crolius, was a German-born American potter who owned kilns in New York City. The business he started operated in New York City from 1730s - 1850s and originally was located on Potbaker's Hill, an underdeveloped area of Lower Manhattan.

He established a dynasty of potters in New York that existed until the 1850s. The Crolius has been called the most important stoneware makers in the history of the USA. As his workshop created some of the earliest known examples of stoneware in the USA, he may have introduced salt-glaze stoneware to North America. Crolius products were widely distributed across several states.

== Early life ==
Crolius was born in Neuwied in the Westerwald region of present-day Germany. Crolius migrated from Eifel to New York City around 1718.

== Career ==
Crolius started his workshop Manhattan sometime before 1730.

His work is associated with other New York pottery families Remney, Commeraw and Kemple. There were over 15 potters named over several generations.

== Personal life ==
In 1724 he married Veronica Cortselius, also born in Neuwied, at the Dutch Reformed Church, New York.

He was a member of the Dutch Reformed Church with other potters from his region: Johannes Remmi and Kemple. Crolius enslaved the family of Thomas Commeraw, manumitting them in his will after he died in 1779.
