= Baxter =

Baxter may refer to:

== Arts and entertainment ==
=== Fictional entities ===
- Baxter Building, in the Marvel Comics universe
- Baxter Stockman, in Teenage Mutant Ninja Turtles
- Baxter, a character in the animated web series Hazbin Hotel
- Mr Baxter, a character in The Adventures of Tintin

=== Film and television ===
- Baxter!, a 1973 British film starring Britt Ekland
- Baxter (film), a 1989 French dark comedy film featuring a thinking dog named "Baxter"
- The Baxter, a 2005 romantic comedy
- The Baxters, a TV sitcom 1979–1981
- Baxter (TV series), 2010–2011
- The Baxters (2024 TV series)

=== Music ===
- Baxter (electronica band), a Swedish electronica band
  - Baxter, an album by the above band
- Baxter (punk band), an American post-hardcore band
  - .baxter., an album by the above band
- Baxter, a 2000 album in which various New Zealand musicians set 12 of James K. Baxter's poems to music

== Businesses and organizations ==
- Baxters, a British food processing company
- Baxter Aviation, former Canadian airline
- Baxter's Coaches, Australian bus company
- Baxter College, a secondary school in Kidderminster, England
- Baxter International, an American healthcare company
- Baxter Street School in Athens, Georgia
- Baxter Theatre Centre, Rondebosch, South Africa
- Philip Baxter College, University of New South Wales, Australia

== People ==
- Baxter (name), including a list of people with the name

== Places ==
=== Antarctica ===
- Mount Baxter (Antarctica)

=== Australia ===
- Baxter, Victoria
  - Baxter railway station
- Baxter Immigration Reception and Processing Centre, near Port Augusta, South Australia
  - Baxter protests of 2003 and 2005
- Baxter Field, baseball stadium in Lismore, New South Wales, Australia

=== Canada ===
- Baxter, Ontario
- Baxter Lakes, in Alberta

=== United States ===
- Baxter, Arkansas
- Baxter County, Arkansas
- Baxter, California
- Baxter, Colorado
- Baxter, Georgia
- Baxter, Iowa
- Baxter, Kentucky
- Baxter, Michigan
- Baxter, Minnesota
- Baxter, Missouri
- Baxter, Pennsylvania
- Baxter Village, South Carolina
- Baxter, Tennessee
- Baxter, Texas
- Baxter, Wisconsin
- Baxter, Berkeley County, West Virginia
- Baxter, Marion County, West Virginia
- Baxter Arena, in the campus of the University of Nebraska, Omaha, U.S.
- Baxter Boulevard, Portland, Maine
- Baxter Building (Portland, Maine), U.S.
- Baxter Creek, a stream in California
- Baxter Estates, New York
- Baxter Lake (New Hampshire)
- Baxter Mill, West Yarmouth, Massachusetts
- Baxter Springs, Kansas
- Baxter State Park, Maine
- Baxter Street Historic District, Quincy, Massachusetts
- Baxter Township, Lac qui Parle County, Minnesota
- Baxter Woods, nature reserve in Portland, Maine
- Mount Baxter (California)

== Other uses ==
- Baxter LePage, former first dog of Maine, U.S.
- Baxter, a 1916 Meteorite fall
- Baxter (robot), an industrial robot

== See also ==
- Baxter House (disambiguation)
- Baxter Street (disambiguation)
- Justice Baxter (disambiguation)
- Baxter v. United States, 1986 federal tax case
- Baxter permutation, a combinatorial object
- Baxter's law, a law of economics
- Baxter, Vera Baxter, a 1977 French film
