= Baxter House =

Baxter House may refer to the following places in the United States (listed by state, then city):

- Baxter House (Pueblo, Colorado), listed on the National Register of Historic Places (NRHP) in Colorado
- Barlow Baxter House, Hestand, Kentucky, listed on the NRHP in Kentucky
- Baxter Summer Home, Falmouth, Maine, NRHP-listed
- Baxter House (Gorham, Maine), NRHP-listed
- Capt. Rodney J. Baxter House, Barnstable, Massachusetts, NRHP-listed
- Capt. Sylvester Baxter House, Barnstable, Massachusetts, NRHP-listed
- Charles L. Baxter House, Barnstable, Massachusetts, NRHP-listed
- Shubael Baxter House, Barnstable, Massachusetts, NRHP-listed
- Baxter–King House, Quincy, Massachusetts, NRHP-listed
- Stoothoff–Baxter–Kouwenhaven House, New York, NY, NRHP-listed
- James Baxter House, Amberley Village, Ohio, NRHP-listed
- Baxter House (Dayton, Oregon), NRHP-listed
- David and Drusilla Baxter House, Orem, Utah, NRHP-listed
- Baxter House (Edom, Virginia), NRHP-listed

== See also ==
- Baxter (disambiguation)
- Baxter Street (disambiguation)
