= Baxter Street (disambiguation) =

Baxter Street may refer to:

- Baxter Street (Manhattan) on the Lower East Side, New York City, New York, U.S.
- Baxter Street Dudes, c. 1870s street gang in New York City
- Baxter Street Historic District in Quincy, Massachusetts, U.S.
- Baxter Street School in Athens, Georgia, U.S.

== See also ==
- Baxter (disambiguation)
- Baxter House (disambiguation)
