= Equal consideration of interests =

Principle in utilitarian ethics

The principle of equal consideration of interests is a moral principle that states that one should both include all affected interests when calculating the rightness of an action and weigh those interests equally. The term "equal consideration of interests" first appeared in Australian moral philosopher Peter Singer's 1975 book Animal Liberation. Singer asserts that if all beings, not just humans, are included as having interests that must be considered, then the principle of equal consideration of interests opposes not only racism and sexism, but also speciesism. Jeremy Bentham argued that a being's capacity to suffer is what is morally relevant when considering their interests, not their capacity for reason.

The principle is related to broader philosophical concepts of impartiality, though impartiality can refer to many other senses of equality, particularly in justice.

== Etymology ==
The expression "equal consideration of interests" first appeared in Practical Ethics, a 1979 book by Peter Singer. The idea is that it is much more relevant to consider the interests of the individual rather than their rights, which are philosophically irrelevant.

== The principle ==
Equal consideration of interests refers to the moral principle that requires human beings to consider equally all the interests of those affected by their actions. They must weigh the interests of all parties on the same scale, to use Singer's metaphor. This principle opposes theories that exclude the interests of certain parties from moral calculations or that measure certain interests differently from others. Jeremy Bentham's early 19th-century maxim "Each counts as one, and none counts as more than one" can be considered the formulation of the principle of equal consideration of interests, and, more generally, the basis of utilitarianism. This principle is also representative of the view of Peter Singer, a utilitarian philosopher who explicitly uses this principle as the basis of his ethical theory.

All individuals with interests, whether simple (interests of not suffering or not dying) or complex, are affected by the principle. Thus, the principle of equal consideration of interests opposes not only racism and sexism, but also speciesism and certain forms of nationalism.

== Arguments for equal consideration of interests ==
Singer argues that the interests of animals should be considered equally to those of humans, in cases where the two groups share a characteristic, such as the experience of suffering. However, in cases where two groups do not have the same characteristics, it would not always be useful to grant them the same rights. For example, it makes sense to grant the right to vote to both men and women, because both men and women have the same interest in being able to vote. But it would be pointless to grant the right to vote to chickens because chickens do not want to vote and would be intellectually incapable of doing so.

In contrast, the Universal Declaration of Human Rights provides that "Everyone has the right to life, liberty and security of person." It is a right that all men and women have an interest in enjoying, but one that chickens and all sentient animals would also have an interest in enjoying. Consequently, according to the principle of equal consideration of interests, all sentient animals, human and non-human alike, should enjoy the right to life, liberty, and security.

In the words of Jeremy Bentham,

"The French have already discovered that the blackness of the skin is no reason a human being should be abandoned without redress to the caprice of a tormentor. It may one day come to be recognised that the number of the legs, the villosity of the skin, or the termination of the os sacrum are reasons equally insufficient for abandoning a sensitive being to the same fate. What else is it that should trace the insuperable line? Is it the faculty of reason or perhaps the faculty of discourse? But a full-grown horse or dog, is beyond comparison a more rational, as well as a more conversable animal, than an infant of a day or a week or even a month, old. But suppose the case were otherwise, what would it avail? The question is not, Can they reason? nor, Can they talk? but, Can they suffer?"

In doing so, Bentham emphasizes that the relevant criterion for granting the right to life and security is the capacity to suffer, not the capacity to reason or to speak. The capacity to suffer is sufficient to require protection from suffering. Singer explains this idea in Animal Equality Explained to Humans:

"The capacity to suffer or to experience pleasure is a necessary condition for having any interest in the first place; it is a condition that must be met, otherwise it makes no sense to speak of interests." It makes no sense to say that it is against a stone's interests to be kicked by a child. A stone has no interests because it cannot suffer. Nothing we can do can have any consequences for its well-being. A mouse, on the other hand, has an interest in not being tormented, because if we torment it, it will suffer."

To determine the most moral course of action, Singer argues that one must consider "how much" one benefits from a situation, versus "how much" another suffers: "The essence of the principle of equal consideration of interests is to give equal weight in our moral reflections to the interests of all those affected by our actions. This means that if only X and Y are affected by an action, and X stands to lose more than Y stands to gain, then it is better not to perform the action." In the case of eating animal flesh, which is not essential for good health, the benefit to humans is only in temporary gustatory pleasure, while the cost to the animal is immense.

== Critiques ==
Philosophy professor Bonnie Steinbock and law professor William Baxter reject the concept of giving equal consideration of interests. They do not dispute the term "equal consideration of interests," but argue that rights granted to individuals are not only always arbitrary, but should be arbitrary.

== See also ==
- Argument from marginal cases
- Impartiality
