= Worth Street =

Street in Manhattan, New York

Coordinates: 40°42′55.5″N 74°0′9.95″W

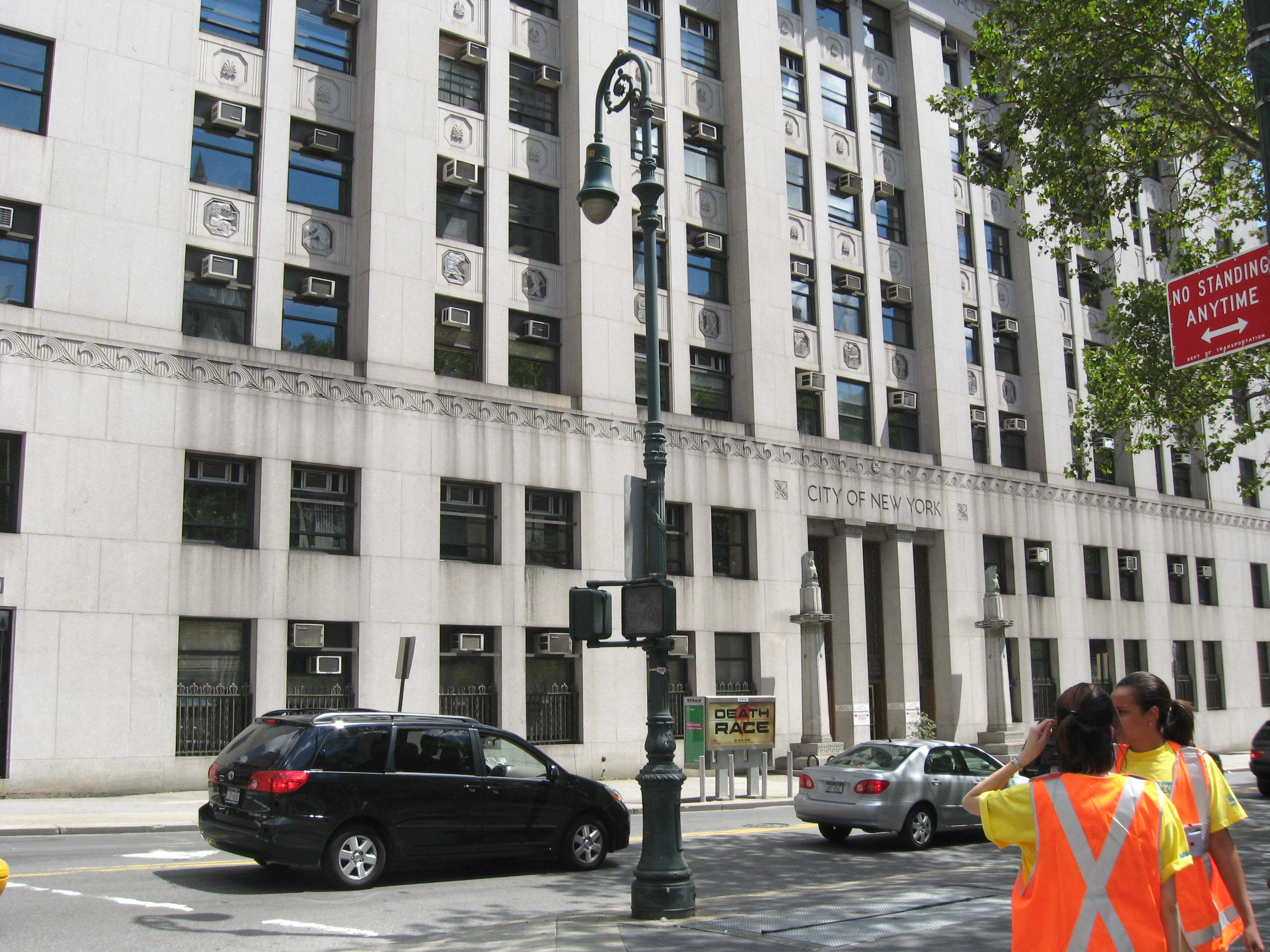
125 Worth Street

Worth Street is a two-way street running roughly northwest-southeast in Manhattan, New York City. It runs from Hudson Street, TriBeCa, in the west to Chatham Square in Chinatown in the east. Past Chatham Square, the roadway continues as Oliver Street, a north-south street running one-way northbound. Between West Broadway and Church Street, Worth Street is also known as Justice John M. Harlan Way in honor of the Supreme Court justice and alumnus of the nearby New York Law School. Between Centre and Baxter Streets, Worth Street is also known as the "Avenue of the Strongest", "New York's Strongest" being a nickname for the city's Department of Sanitation.

The western end of Worth Street, between Hudson Street and West Broadway, abuts 60 Hudson Street, the former Western Union headquarters that later was converted into an internet hub. Worth Street passes through the cluster of government offices and courthouses centered on Foley Square. 125 Worth Street (at Centre Street) houses the headquarters of the New York City Health and Hospitals Corporation, the Department of Health and Mental Hygiene, and the Department of Sanitation. Additionally, the New York Supreme Court courthouses at 60 Centre Street and 80 Centre Street (the Louis J. Lefkowitz Building) and the Daniel Patrick Moynihan Federal Courthouse (Southern District of New York) at 500 Pearl Street all have entrances facing Worth Street.

== History ==
What is now Worth Street originally started at the Five Points intersection and headed west; it was known as Anthony Street. In 1797, it was named Catherine Street (separately from the other Catherine Street to the southeast, which remains today, as well as another one to the north). Starting at Hudson Street, it ended at the western bank of the Collect Pond. Catherine Lane, which ran parallel and to the north, still exists as an alleyway between Broadway and Lafayette Street. An 1807 map shows that the pond was filled in, and that Anthony Street ran to an unlabeled short street where Centre Street is now. After 1811, Anthony Street was extended to Orange Street (later renamed Baxter Street), completing the "fifth point" of the intersection by bisecting its northeast corner. In 1854, it was renamed Worth Street in honor of Major-general William J. Worth, hero of the 1848 Mexican War. Worth is buried two miles north in Worth Square, which is at the north end of Madison Square near 26th Street. In 1868, the city opened the section from Five Points east to Chatham Square.

On February 5, 2016, a crane collapsed on Worth Street at 60 Hudson Street, killing one person and injuring two others.

== Transportation ==
Bus service is provided by the westbound M22 from Chatham Square to Lafayette Street.

The Worth Street station on the New York City Subway's IRT Lexington Avenue Line opened in 1904 as part of the first subway line in New York City. The station was closed in 1962 due to the expansion of the nearby Brooklyn Bridge–City Hall station.
