= William J. Worth =

United States Army general

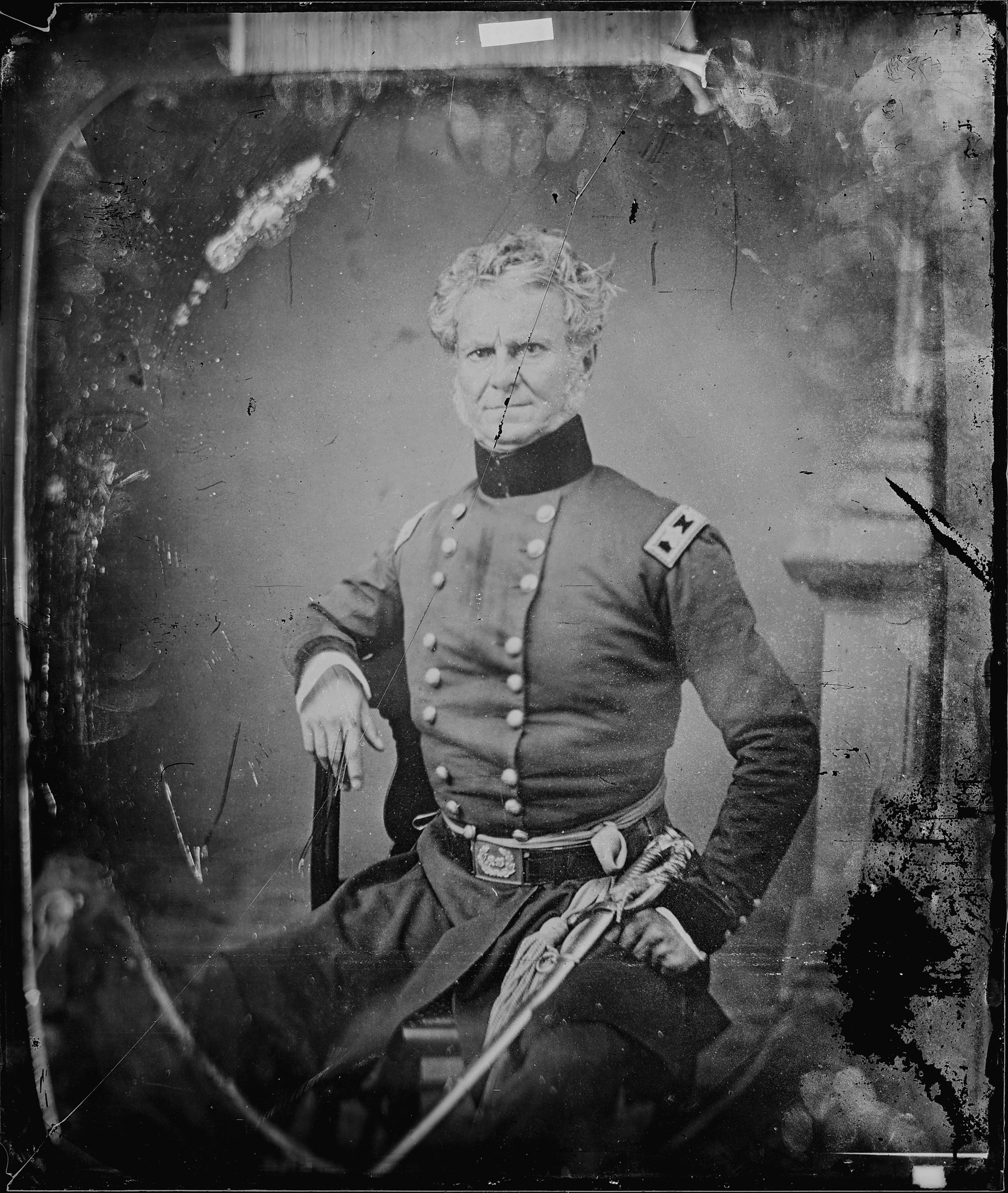
- Born: William Jenkins Worth; March 1, 1794; Hudson, New York, U.S.
- Died: May 7, 1849 (aged 55); San Antonio, Texas, U.S.
- Burial place: Worth Square, New York city, U.S.
- Military career
- Allegiance: United States
- Branch: US Army
- Service years: 1813–1849
- Rank: Colonel; Brevet Major General
- Commands: 8th Infantry Regiment
- Conflicts: War of 1812: Battle of Fort George; Battle of Chippawa; Battle of Crysler's Farm; Battle of Lundy's Lane; Second Seminole War Mexican–American War: Battle of Monterrey; Siege of Veracruz; Battle of Cerro Gordo; Battle of Contreras; Battle of Churubusco; Battle of Molino del Rey; Battle of Chapultepec

William Jenkins Worth (March 1, 1794 – May 7, 1849) was an American officer during the War of 1812, the Second Seminole War, and the Mexican–American War.

== Early military career ==
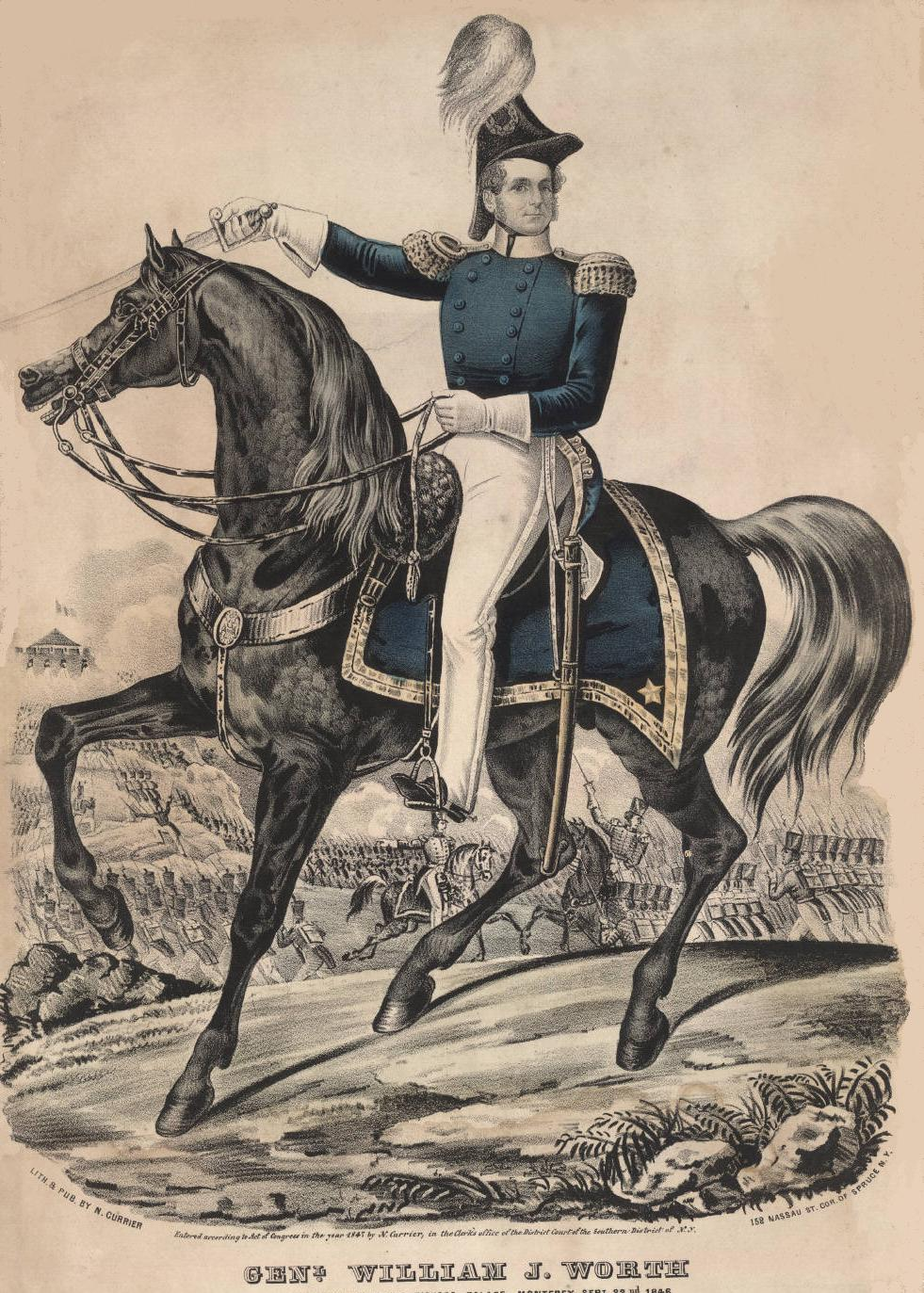
Worth at the Battle of Monterrey, 1846

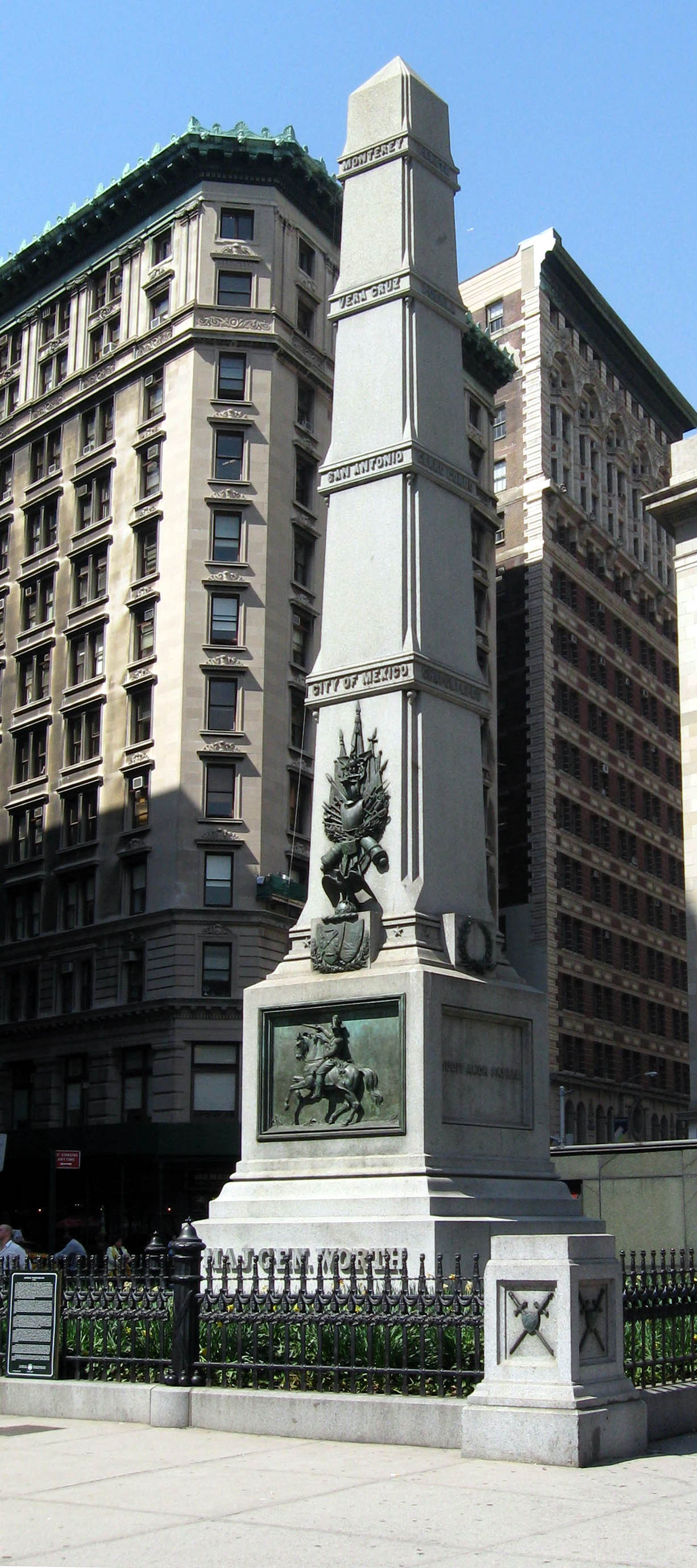
Monument on Worth Square

Worth was commissioned as a first lieutenant in March 1813, serving as an aide to (then brigadier general) Winfield Scott during the war, and developing a friendship with him. He later named his son Winfield Scott Worth. He distinguished himself at the battles of Chippewa and Lundy's Lane during the Niagara campaign. In the latter battle, he was seriously wounded by grapeshot in the thigh. He was not expected to survive, but after a year's confinement, he emerged with the breveted rank of Major—though he would remain lame for the rest of his life. Also as a brevet Major Worth uttered his most famous words that are now inscribed in West Point's "Bugle Notes", a book of knowledge all cadets must know by heart. They are as follows:

But an officer on duty knows no one—to be partial is to dishonor both himself and the object of his ill-advised favor. What will be thought of him who exacts of his friends that which disgraces him? Look at him who winks at and overlooks offences in one, which he causes to be punished in another, and contrast him with the inflexible soldier who does his duty faithfully, notwithstanding it occasionally wars with his private feelings. The conduct of one will be venerated and emulated, the other detested as a satire upon soldiership and honor.

— Brevet Major General William Jenkins Worth

After the war he was Commandant of Cadets at West Point and would rise to the rank of colonel in 1838 when he was put in command of the newly created Eighth Infantry Regiment. Using his own tactics he successfully prosecuted the Second Seminole War in Florida and was made a brevet brigadier general in 1842. Eventually, he convinced Secretary of War John C. Spencer to allow the remaining Indians in the territory to confine themselves to an unofficial reservation in southwest Florida, and declared an official end to the war in August of that year.

== Mexican–American War ==
When the Mexican–American War began, Worth was serving under Zachary Taylor in Texas and negotiated the surrender of the Mexican city of Matamoros. He next commanded the 2nd Regular Division, Army of Occupation at the Battle of Monterrey in September 1846, for which he was later brevetted to major general. In 1847, Worth was transferred to his old friend Winfield Scott's army and placed in command of the 1st Division.

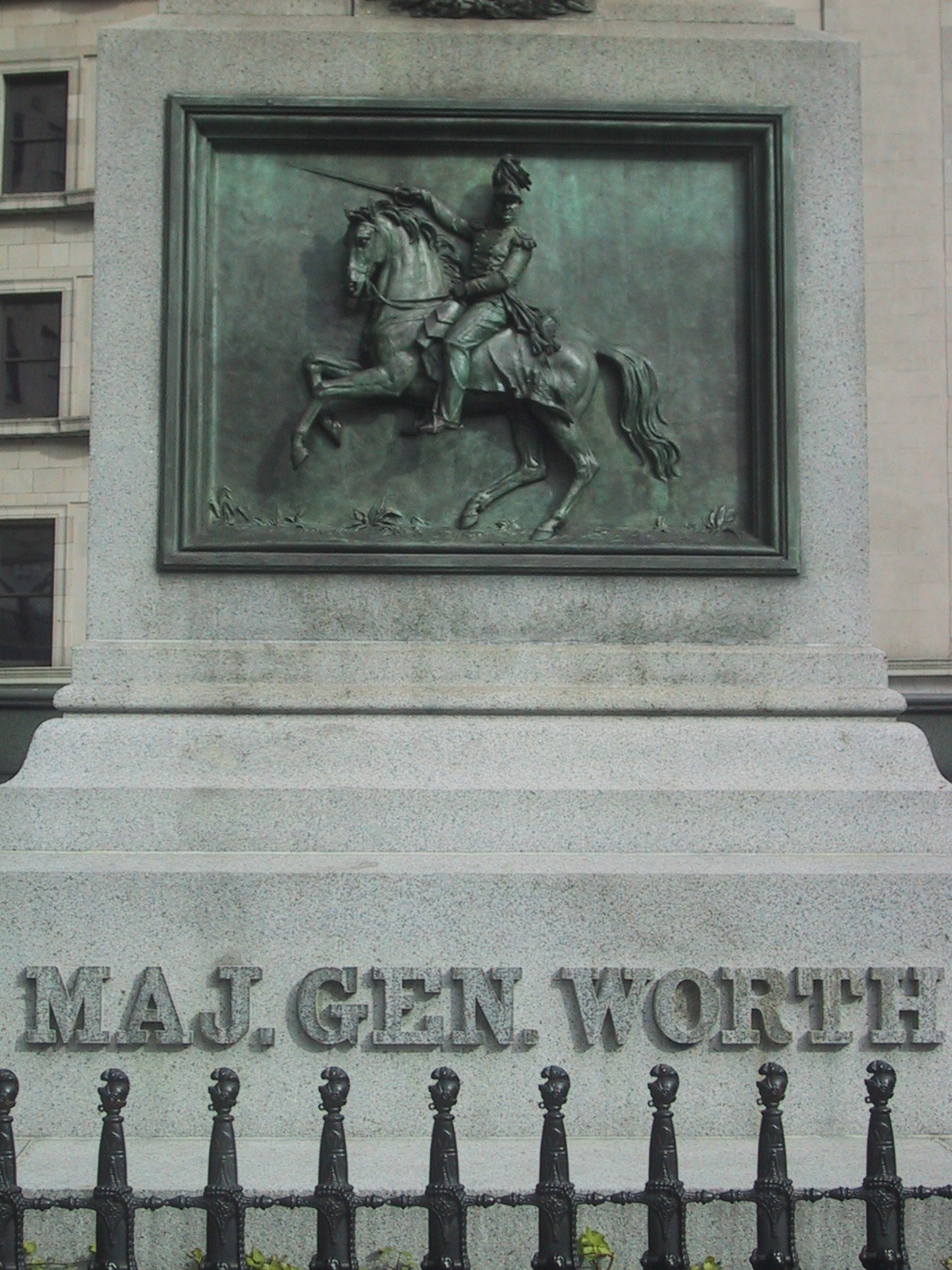
Monument on Worth Square in Manhattan

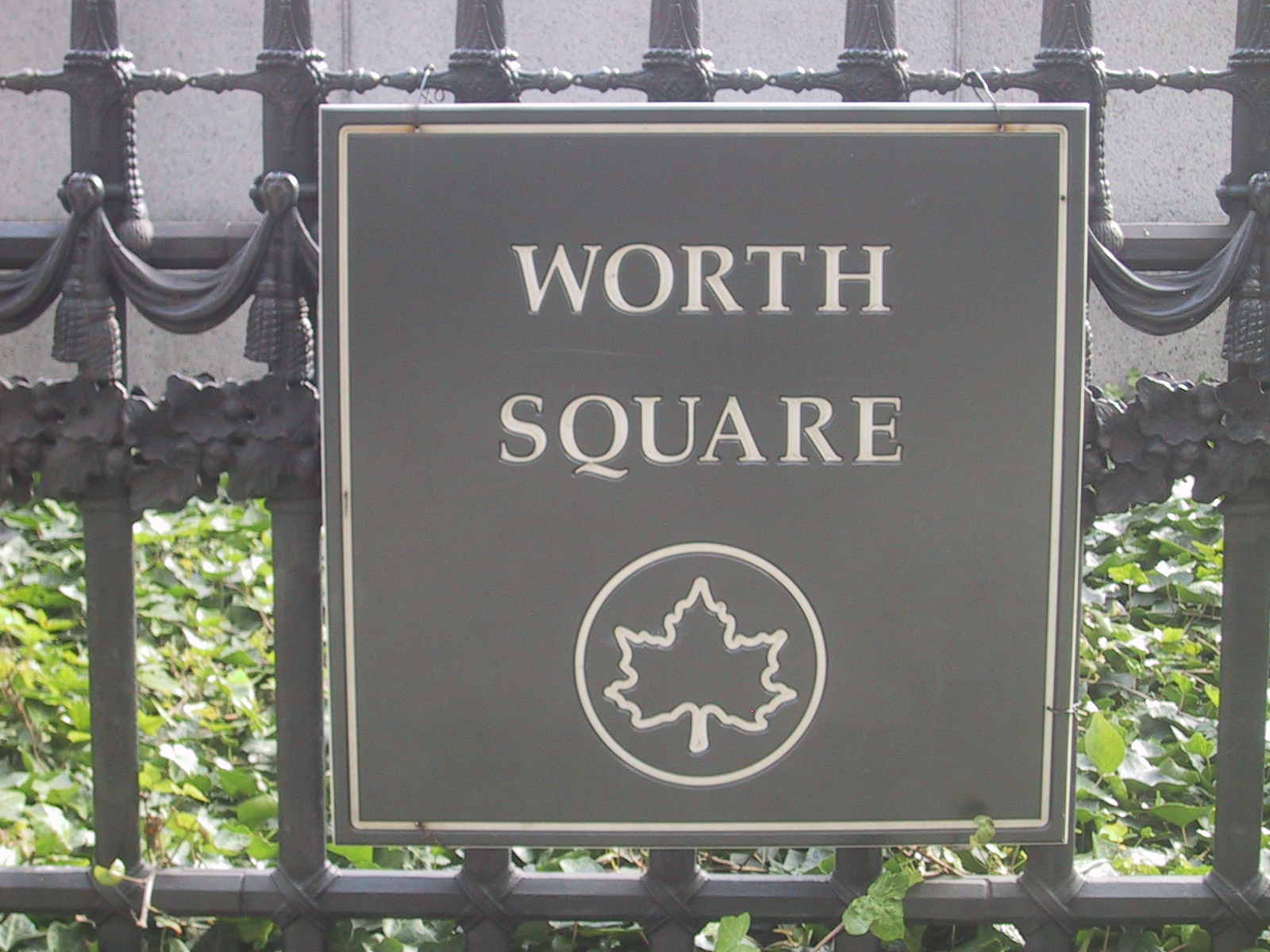
Worth Square

He took part in the siege of Veracruz and engaged in the Battles of Cerro Gordo, Contreras, and Churubusco. In Mexico City, Scott ordered Worth to seize the Mexican works at the Molino del Rey. Worth and Scott's friendship came to a head when Scott refused to allow Worth to modify the attack and the battle caused the 1st Division severe casualties, much to Worth's dismay. Worth later renamed his son Winfield Scott to William. He next led his division against the San Cosme Gate at Mexico City. When U.S. forces entered Mexico City, Worth personally climbed to the roof of the National Palace and took down the Mexican flag replacing it with the Stars and Stripes.

For his service at the Battle of Chapultepec, the United States Congress awarded him with a sword of honor.

In 1847, Worth became an Original Member of the Aztec Club of 1847 and was admitted as an honorary member of the New York Society of the Cincinnati.

== Postwar service and death ==
In 1848, Worth was approached by a group of Cuban Freemasons known as the Havana Club, composed of sugar plantation owners and aristocrats, who advocated the overthrow of the Spanish colonial government in Cuba. The Havana Club sent a college professor Ambrosio José Gonzales to entreat Worth to lead an invasion of Cuba.

Knowing Worth was also a Freemason, Gonzales greeted the war hero with the Masonic secret handshake, and subsequently offered him three million dollars to lead an invasion force of five thousand American veterans of the Mexican-American War against the Spanish in Cuba. Worth accepted the offer, but before the plot could be concluded, he was transferred by the War Department to Texas.

Worth was in command of the Department of Texas when he died in 1849 in San Antonio of cholera.

== Burials ==
Worth's remains were originally deposited in Green-Wood Cemetery where they sat unburied for four years. In January 1855, a committee was established to design a suitable monument for General Worth. The monument was designed and built by James G. Batterson in 1857. On November 25, 1857, Worth's remains were reinterred in the 51-foot granite monument on Worth Square on a traffic island between Fifth Avenue and Broadway at 25th Street in New York City's borough of Manhattan. The General William Jenkins Worth Monument is the second oldest monument in New York.

The monument's central decorative bands are inscribed with battle sites significant in Worth's career and attached to its front is a bronze equestrian relief of Worth.

Each spike of the cast-iron fence surrounding the memorial is topped with a plumed helmet, reflective of the plumed helmet Worth is shown wearing in the memorial. The American painter Thomas Hart Benton depicted the obelisk in New York, Early Twenties. The north side fence was removed around 1940 to accommodate an above-ground utility shed which services the water supply system pipes beneath the monument.

== Family ==
In 1818, Worth married Margaret Stafford of Albany, New York. They were married until his death and were the parents of four children. Mary was the wife of army officer John T. Sprague. Margaret Worth never married and was a resident of Staten Island. Josephine resided in Albany and was the wife of Howard James. William Scott Worth was a career army officer who attained the rank of brigadier general.

== Legacy and honors ==
The cities of Fort Worth and Lake Worth in Texas, the villages of Worth in Illinois and Worthville in Kentucky, and the Worth Counties in Georgia, Missouri, and Iowa are all named in his honor.

In Florida the Lake Worth Lagoon, the city of Lake Worth Beach, and Worth Avenue in Palm Beach are also named after him.

Additionally, Worth Street in the Lower Manhattan district of New York City was named in his honor.

== Dates of rank ==
- 1st Lieutenant, 23rd Infantry - 19 March 1813
- Brevet Captain - 5 July 1814
- Brevet Major - 25 July 1814
- Captain, 23rd Infantry - 19 August 1814
- Captain, 2nd Infantry - 17 May 1815
- Captain, 1st Artillery - l June 1821
- Brevet Lieutenant Colonel - 25 July 1824
- Major, Ordnance Corps - 30 May 1832
- Colonel, 8th Infantry - 7 July 1838
- Brevet Brigadier General - 1 Mar 1842
- Brevet Major General - 23 Sept 1846
- Died - 7 May 1849.

== See also ==
- Seminole Wars
- Battle of Molino del Rey
- Battle for Mexico City
- William S. Worth, his son

Military offices
Preceded by John R. Bell	Commandants of Cadets of the United States Military Academy; 1820–1828	Succeeded by Ethan A. Hitchcock
