= William S. Worth =

American general (1840–1904)

William Scott Worth
- Worth in an 1898 publication
- Born: January 6, 1840; Albany, New York, U.S.
- Died: October 16, 1904 (aged 64); Clifton, Staten Island, New York, U.S.
- Spouse: Florence Mansfield (m. 1880)
- Relatives: William J. Worth (father)
- Military career
- Branch: United States Army
- Service years: 1861–1898
- Rank: Brigadier General
- Unit: 8th Infantry Regiment
- Commands: 13th Infantry Regiment
- Conflicts: American Civil War; Maryland campaign; Battle of Antietam; Gettysburg campaign; Battle of Gettysburg; Siege of Petersburg; Bannock War; Spanish–American War; Battle of San Juan Hill (WIA)

William Scott Worth (January 6, 1840 October 16, 1904) was an American brigadier general of the American Civil War and the Spanish–American War. He was known for being the son of Major General William J. Worth and leading the 13th Infantry Regiment during the Battle of San Juan Hill.

== American Civil War ==
William was born on January 6, 1840, at Albany, New York as the only son of William J. Worth and Margaret Stafford Worth. Before the American Civil War broke out, Worth was operating at a silver mine in New Mexico. When news reached upon the Confederate secession, Worth traveled to Washington, D.C. and was mustered as a 2nd Lieutenant within the 8th Infantry Regiment on April 26, 1861, and promoted to 1st Lieutenant on June 7, 1861. Worth was then made an Adjutant from September 5, 1861, to April 13, 1862, as well as being on the General Staff of Henry Jackson Hunt around the summer of 1862, participating at the Battle of Antietam. Around this time, a proposal was made to make Worth the aide-de-camp to Major General Joseph Hooker but continued to serve with Hunt, going on to participate at the Battle of Gettysburg with him. Worth was brevetted two times, once to captain on August 1, 1864, for "assault on the enemy's lines before Petersburg and in the operations in the campaign against Richmond, Va" and to major on April 9, 1865, for "gallant and meritorious service during the campaign terminating with the surrender of the insurgent army under gen RE Lee". Around this time, Worth was transferred to serve General George Meade within the Army of the Potomac until the end of the war.

== Frontier and Spanish-American War ==
Worth remained in the U.S. Army and was promoted to captain on January 14, 1866. By 1869, the 8th Infantry Regiment was merged with the 1st Battalion of the 17th Infantry Regiment into the 23rd Infantry Regiment. He went on to serve at Arizona and Oregon for the next 25 years until he was promoted to major on March 9, 1881, within the 2nd Infantry Regiment. Worth's regiment was transferred to Oregon during the Bannock War.

In 1880, he married Florence Mansfield who was the daughter of The Reverend Delos Mansfield. They had a son who died young.

He was transferred to the 13th Infantry Regiment as its lieutenant colonel on November 26, 1894. He then lead the 2nd Brigade of the V Corps but was wounded during the Battle of San Juan Hill. After being promoted to colonel of the 16th Infantry Regiment on August 11, 1898, he became a brigadier general of volunteers from July 12, 1898, to October 28, 1898, when he was given full generalship on October 29 and held that rank until his retirement on November 9, 1898.

== Later life ==
Before his death, Worth was a member of the Aztec Society, the Military Order of the Loyal Legion of the United States, the General Society of Colonial Wars, the Society of the Army of the Potomac and the Society of the Cincinnati.

Worth died on October 16, 1904 in Clifton, Staten Island at the home of a nephew.
