= Baxter–King House =

Historic house in Massachusetts, United States

- U.S. National Register of Historic Places
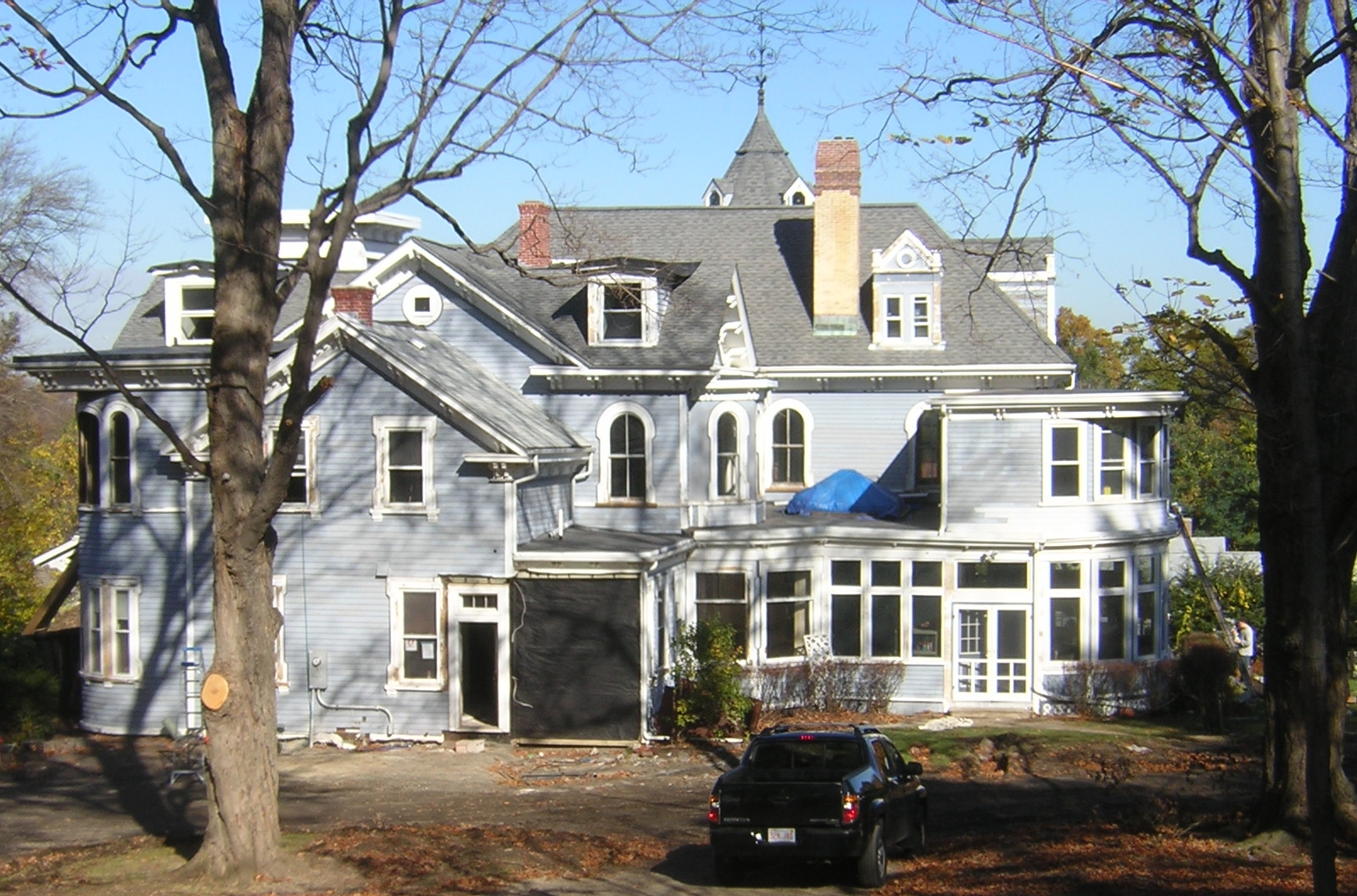

- Location within Massachusetts Location within the United States
- Location: 36 Heritage Road Quincy, Massachusetts
- Coordinates: 42°15′11.5″N 71°0′53″W
- Area: 3.1 acres (1.3 ha)
- Built: 1860
- Architectural style: Italianate
- MPS: Quincy MRA
- NRHP reference No.: 89001953
- Added to NRHP: November 13, 1989

The Baxter–King House is a historic house at 36 Heritage Road in Quincy, Massachusetts. The 2 1/2-story wood-frame house was built in the 1860s, and is one of the city's finest Italianate houses. The L-shaped house dominated by a three-story square tower with a shallow hip roof that has a bracketed and modillioned eave. An elaborately decorated entry projects from the tower. Windows are varied in shape, including round-arch windows with drip moulding, and single and doubled sash windows. The house was built by James Baxter Jr., whose daughter Helen married Theophilus King. King owned a leather business in Boston and was president of the Granite Trust Company.

The house was listed on the National Register of Historic Places in 1989.
