= Baxter, Missouri =

Extinct town in the American state of Missouri

Coordinates: 36.5108931°N 89.9317562°W

Baxter is an extinct town in New Madrid County, in the U.S. state of Missouri. The GNIS classifies it as a populated place.

The community was named after one Mr. Baxter, the proprietor of a local lumber operation.
