= David and Drusilla Baxter House =

Historic house in Utah, United States

- U.S. National Register of Historic Places
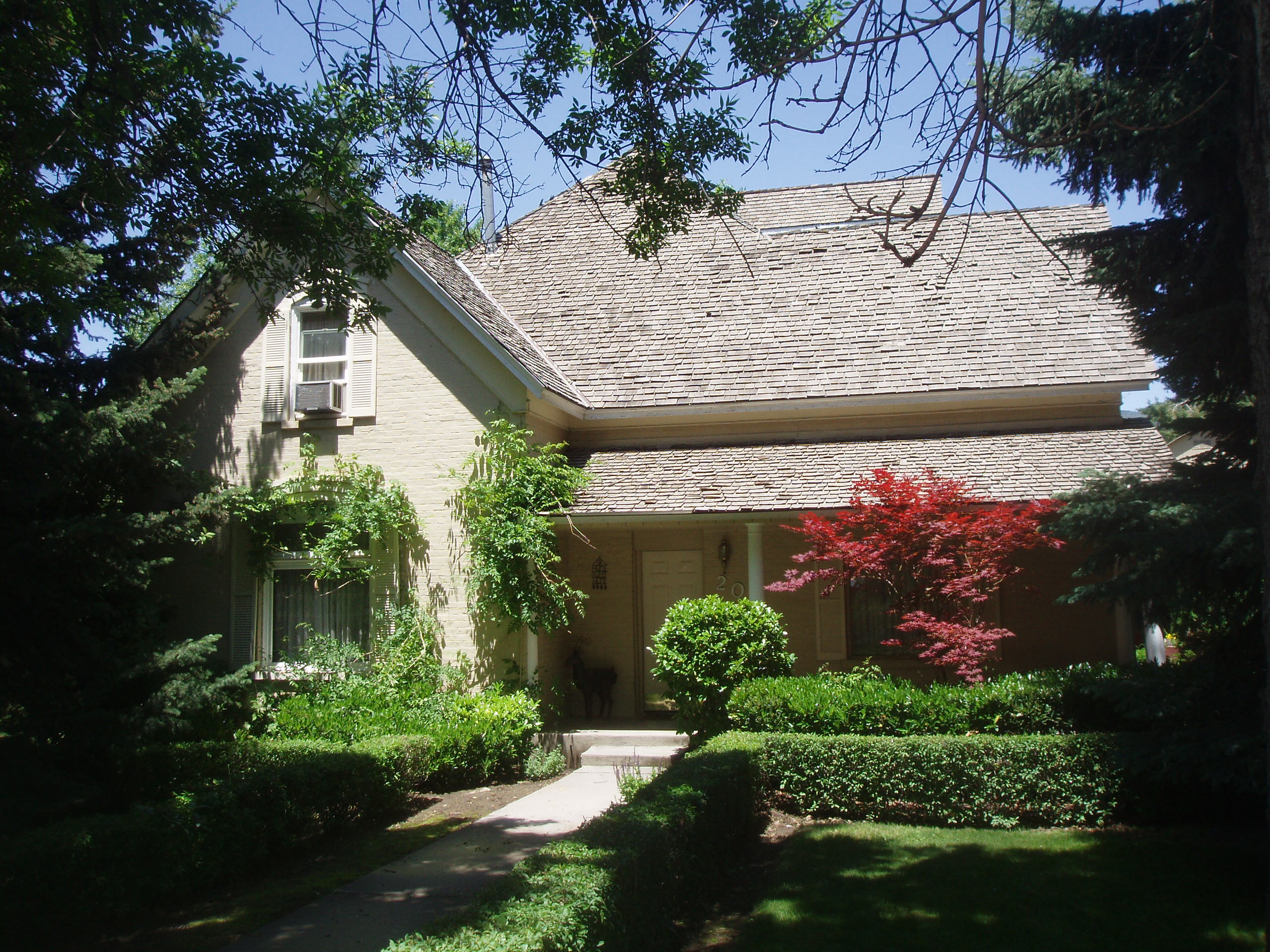

- Location within Utah Location within the United States
- Location: 206 W. 1600 N., Orem, Utah
- Coordinates: 40°19′37″N 111°42′1″W
- Area: 0.7 acres (0.28 ha)
- Built: 1895
- Architectural style: Late Victorian
- MPS: Orem, Utah MPS
- NRHP reference No.: 98000653
- Added to NRHP: June 11, 1998

The David and Drusilla Baxter House at 206 W. 1600 N. in Orem, Utah was built in 1895. It was listed on the National Register of Historic Places in 1998.

According to its NRHP nomination, the house is a "good example of the transitional character of the architecture on the Provo Bench at the latter-part of the 19th century"; it includes Classical and Late Victorian elements.
