= William Baxter (law professor) =

American law professor (1929–1998)

William Francis Baxter, Jr. (July 13, 1929 – November 27, 1998) was a law professor at Stanford University. His specialty was antitrust law.

== Antitrust law ==
As Assistant Attorney General in charge of the Antitrust Division of the United States Department of Justice from 1981–1983, Baxter commanded wide public attention when in 1982 he settled a seven-year-old case against AT&T with by far the largest breakup in the history of the Sherman Antitrust Act, splitting AT&T up into seven regional phone companies. On that same day, he dismissed as "without merit" a seemingly endless, thirteen-year-old suit against IBM, which had employed more than 300 lawyers and generated 2,500 depositions and 66 million pages of documents. Additionally, under his leadership, the U.S. Justice Department promulgated revised guidelines that it would use to enforce U.S. antitrust laws going forward. As part of that practice, he is the author of Baxter's Law or the Bell Doctrine.

== Animal rights ==
In 1974, Baxter published a widely read and influential book on the law and economics of pollution control entitled People or Penguins: The Case for Optimal Pollution. This book, though aimed at a law audience, contains a philosophically sophisticated stance on the topic of animal rights.

Baxter maintains that non-human animals have no moral consideration on their own. Any moral consideration of animals is in relation to humans. Moral consideration is a uniquely human affair. This differs from the view that there is no essential difference between the pain of non-human animals and that of human beings (see Peter Singer), and also differs from the view that the pain of animals is a morally relevant consideration, but is not morally decisive (See Bonnie Steinbock).

Baxter is not antipathetic toward non-human animals; in fact, he points out that many things that are in the interests of animals (and the larger environment for that matter) are in fact also in the best interests of humans as well. In this sense we have obligations to how we treat non-human animals, but the grounds is only because of the respective impact on human beings.

Baxter states that the way to measure these humans interests are in terms of a cost benefit analysis, where cost doesn't necessarily mean uniquely monetary costs.

== See also ==
- Baxter's Law
