= Baxter Summer Home =

Historic house in Maine, United States

- U.S. National Register of Historic Places
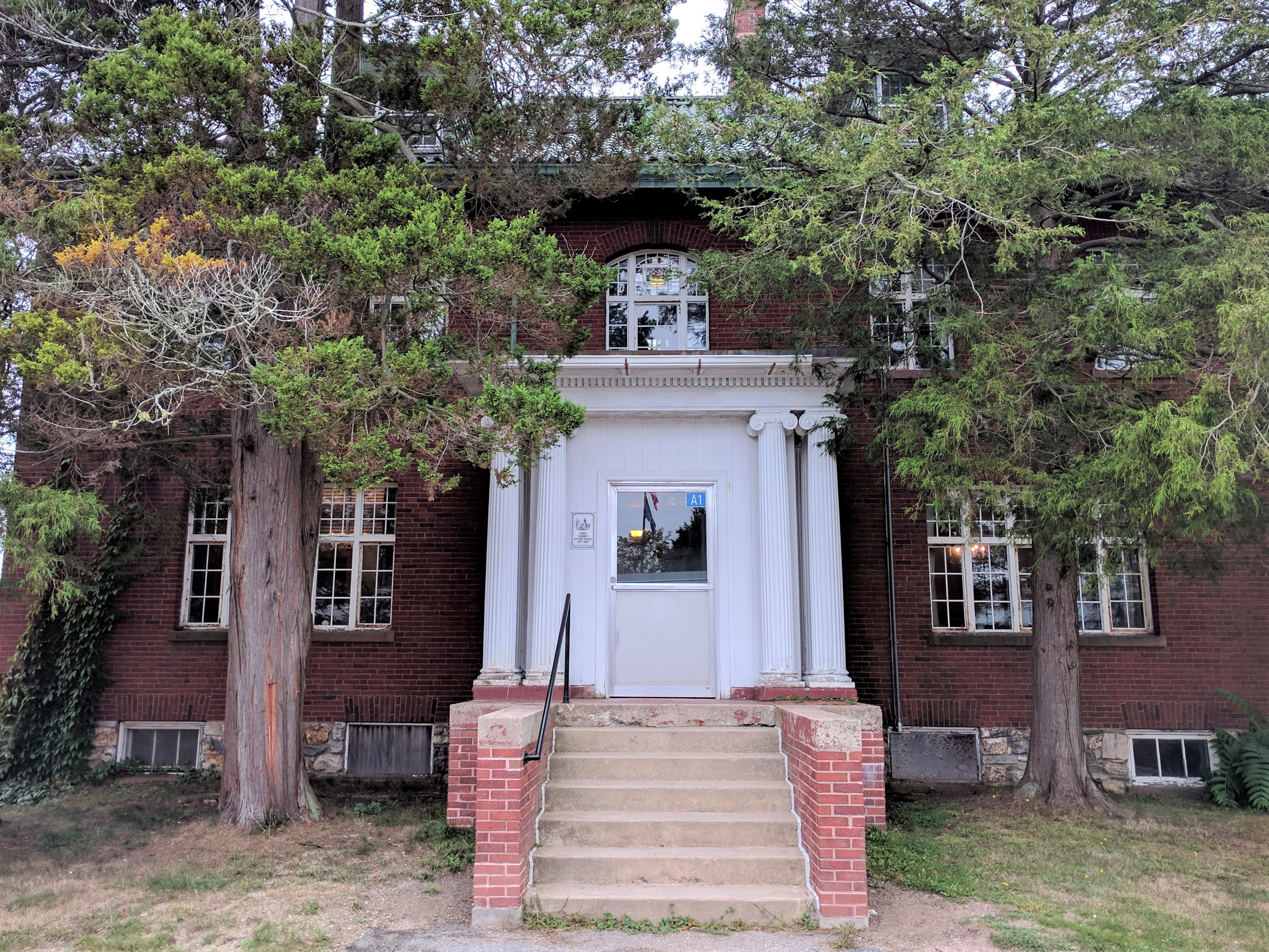

- Location within Maine Location within the United States
- Location: Mackworth Island, Falmouth, Maine
- Coordinates: 43°41′17″N 70°13′59″W
- Area: 0.3 acres (0.12 ha)
- Built: 1917
- Architect: Frederick Thomason
- NRHP reference No.: 85003155
- Added to NRHP: December 26, 1985

The Baxter Summer Home is a historic house on Mackworth Island, in Casco Bay off the coast of Falmouth, Maine. Now a centerpiece of the campus of the Governor Baxter School for the Deaf, the house was built in 1917–18 by James Phinney Baxter, and was given (along with the rest of the island) to the state by his son Percival, a two-term Governor of Maine best known for establishing Baxter State Park. The house was listed on the National Register of Historic Places in 1985.

== Description and history ==
The former Baxter Summer Home is located near the center of Mackworth Island, a roughly circular island located just off the coast of Maine, and joined to it by a causeway. Most of the island is a state park, and open to the public. The house is located in a campus-like setting, surrounded by the dormitories and school facilities of the Governor Baxter School for the Deaf, an area not generally accessible to the public except by prior arrangement.

The house is a 2½ story masonry structure, built out of dark red brick, with a green terracotta tile roof and a fieldstone foundation. An enclosed porch extends along the south side of the building, and there is a circular solarium on the north side. The main entrance faces east, and is flanked by sidelights, with a transom window above which has stained glass highlights in a sailing motif. The entry is sheltered by a portico supported by Ionic columns and Doric pilasters.

Mackworth Island was purchased in 1885 by James Phinney Baxter, a six-time mayor of Portland and a leading historian and businessman of the period. He retained Portland architect Frederick Thompson to design this house, which was built in 1917–18, replacing an earlier wood-frame structure (since demolished). The property was inherited by his son Percival, who served two terms as Governor of Maine in the 1920s, and most notably gave the state most of the lands that make up Baxter State Park. In 1943 he donated the island to the state to provide a permanent home for the state School for the Deaf, which was renamed in his honor. The school moved onto the island in the 1950s.

== See also ==
- National Register of Historic Places listings in Cumberland County, Maine
