= Baxter Street Dudes =

1870s New York City teenage street gang

- Founders: Baby-Faced Willie
- Founding location: New York City
- Years active: ~1870s
- Territory: Baxter Street
- Membership: Newsboys, bootblacks
- Activities: Tax evasion, thievery, entertainment, charity
- Rivals: Mulberry Blend

The Baxter Street Dudes was a New York City teenage street gang, consisting of former newsboys and bootblacks, who ran the Grand Duke's Theatre from the basement of a dive bar on Baxter Street in Manhattan during the 1870s. Led by founder Baby-Face Willie, gang members operated the Grand Duke's Theatre and established the venue as their headquarters. Members of the Baxter Street Dudes wrote and performed plays, musicals and variety shows which were enjoyed by other street toughs and slummers throughout the city. The theater house eventually became a popular underworld hangout, from which the gang found financial success.

== History ==
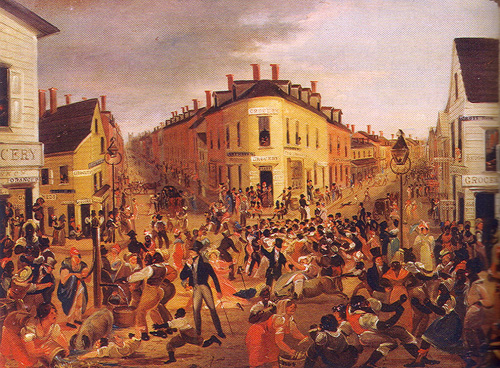
Five Points by George Catlin, 1827

When Grand Duke's Theatre was at its peak, many movements occurring across the United States influenced the organization's ability to function. In the post-war period following the bitter American Civil War, the volume of immigrants settling in the Northeastern United States became massive. European emigration increased the population significantly, making the culture of New York City more diverse. New York and neighboring states were rapidly developing, with notable technical achievements including the introduction of the elevator and the creation of the first telephone line.

== Street children in New York ==
In the 1870s, America experienced a depression that forced many people, including children, to live on the streets. About 5,000 to 10,000 boys were estimated to be living on the streets of New York City by the 1850s. The Children's Aid Society reported around 15,000 homeless youths in 1870. Children were uneducated and treated poorly, enabling theft, mainly in the form of pick-pocketing. The number of pickpocket trials in the New York court rose from 52 in 1859 to 242 in 1876. Most children involved with these cases were between the ages of 15 and 24.

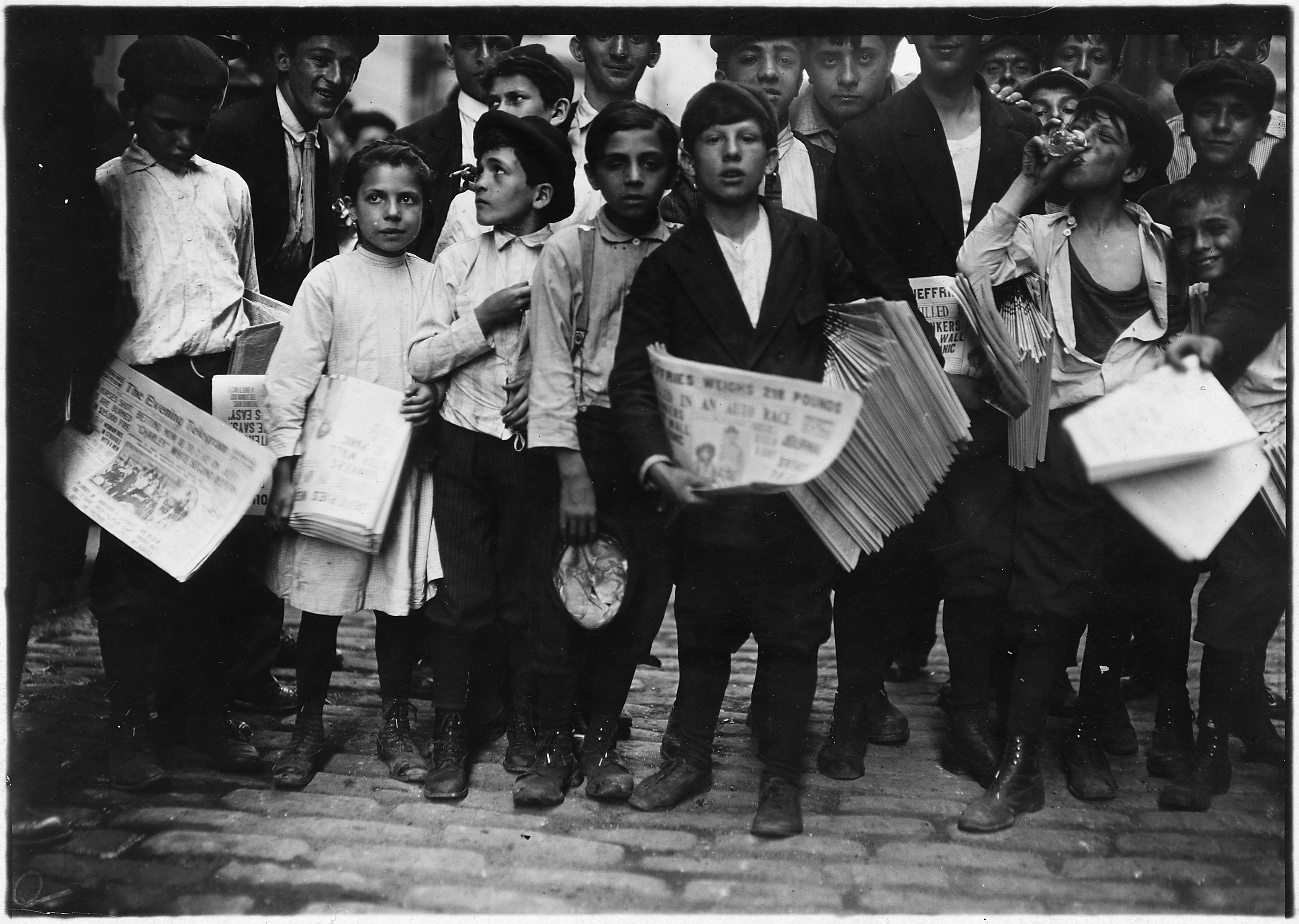
Young children collecting afternoon papers in 1910.

Many children began their own newspaper-selling enterprises, commonly known as newsboys. Children around the age of ten purchased newspapers from local publishers and sold them to passers-by on the street. Newsboys often organized together to protect themselves and their earnings. Older adolescent males hired and managed younger boys and formed their own community of street children.

A group of teenagers on Baxter Street, consisting of mainly newsboys, formed the Baxter Street Dudes with fellow neighborhood members, experiencing a similar struggle during a dark economic period.

== Baxter Street ==
In the 1800s, the Baxter Street Dudes operated and expanded into two districts within the Five Points, including Baxter Street and Mosco Street. A well-known detention complex, The Tombs, was situated in the Five Points neighborhood, and held many high-profile criminals.

Despite the active gangs in the late 1870s that enabled Baxter Street to earn a dangerous reputation, The Baxter Street Dudes were a nonviolent group of individuals. The Baxter Street Dudes experienced minor quarrels at the Grand Duke's Theatre between rival street organizations known for mugging, murdering, and tormenting citizens and other street thugs. Throughout performances by the Baxter Street Dudes at Grand Duke's Theatre, members of fellow gangs were known to disrupt actors by causing physical altercations, which eventually led to the foreclosure of the theater by the New York City Police Department. In addition to audience members impacting theater functionality, the Baxter Street Dudes refused to pay amusement taxes to the city.

The gang has been portrayed in a number of historical novels including Dreamland (2003) by Kevin Baker, The Five Points Concluded (2003) by Rocco Dormarunno, Sweet America: An Immigrants Story (2004) by Steven Kroll and Heyday: A Novel (2007) by Kurt Andersen.

== The Grand Duke's Theatre ==
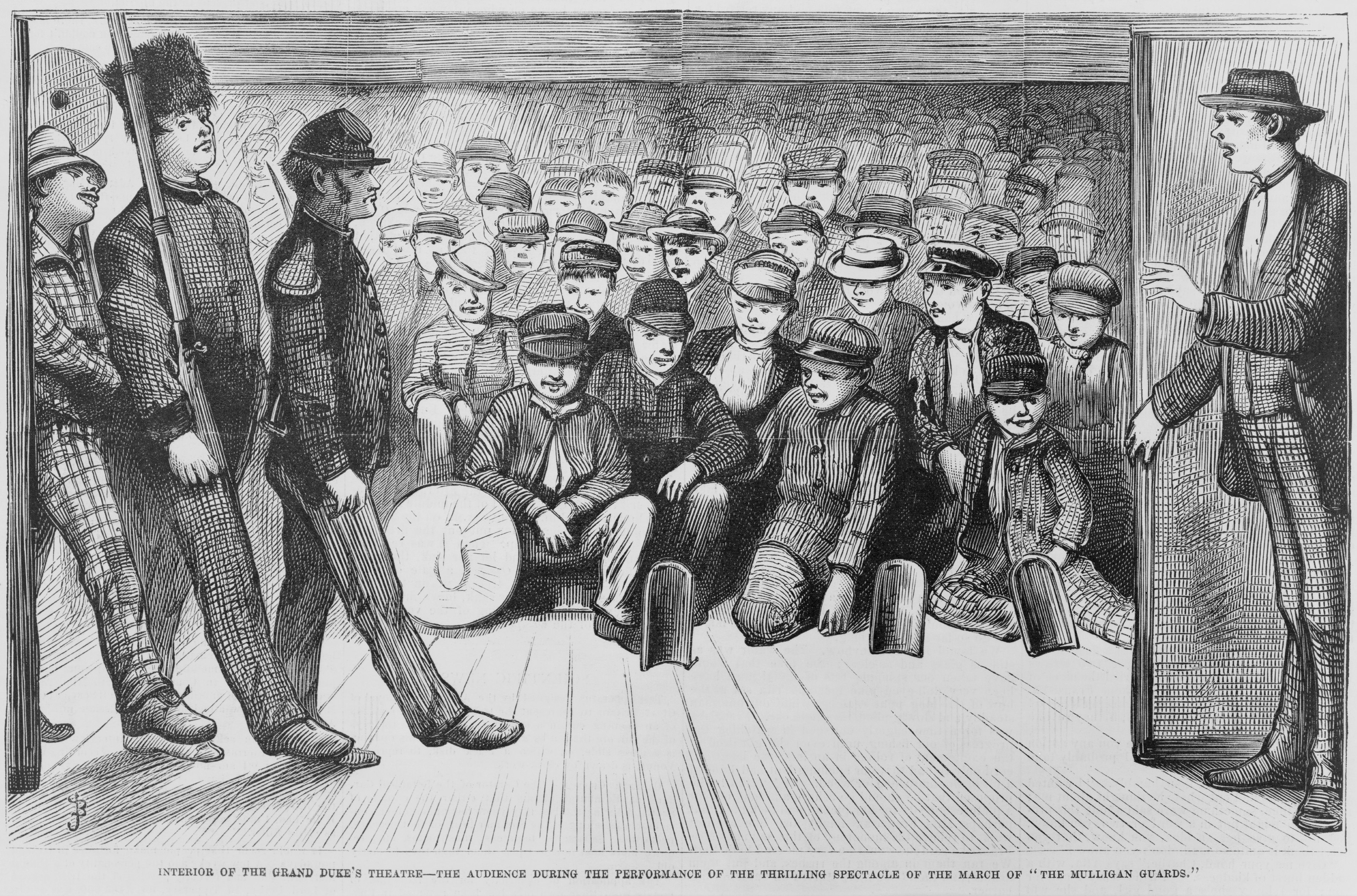
Interior of the Grand Duke's Theater. The audience during the performance of the thrilling spectacle of the march of "The Mulligan Guards" in 1874

The Baxter Street Dudes started the Grand Duke's Theatre in 1872 under a bar at 21 Baxter Street in Manhattan. They performed to audiences of up to 300 people, selling tickets at 5¢ a person to 25¢ for private booths. These prices eventually rose to 20¢ a seat and $5 a booth because of their increased popularity. Demand for theater grew in New York City and the Baxter Street Dudes began making a $70 a week which was usually donated to charity.

When the Grand Duke Alexei Alexandrovich of Russia visited New York, the boys named their establishment the Grand Duke's Theatre after him. Members of the gang would steal their props and costumes, spending very little on their production. Despite the poor quality of their stage equipment, they consistently had popular performances for several years. Their fame as a performing group led them to travel outside of New York and performed in other cities at theaters, churches, and schools.

New York began charging $500 for theater licensing in 1872, claiming slum theaters were negatively influencing the younger generations. The theater was challenged in court for not paying the fee in 1874 but its owners were able to win and stay in business.
