= Bonnie Steinbock =

American philosopher (born 1947)

- Born: 1947 (age 78–79)
- Occupation: Philosopher

Bonnie Steinbock (born 1947) is a professor emerita of philosophy at the University at Albany and a specialist in bioethics who has written on topics such as abortion, end of life issues, and animal rights.

== Biography ==
Steinbock received her Ph.D. from the University of California, Berkeley. She is a fellow of the Hastings Center, an independent bioethics research institution. She now lives in Oakland, CA, with her husband, Paul Menzel. In retirement, she has been a visiting professor at the Chinese University of Hong Kong and Monash University in Melbourne, Australia. In retirement, she continues to publish, her most recent article being "Physician-Assisted Death and Severe, Treatment-Resistant Depression," Hastings Center Report 47, no. 5 (2017): 30-42. In November 2018, she delivered "The Ethics of Editing Embryos," at the National Conference of Bioethics in Shanghai, China.

Questions from her examinations have appeared in the "Education Life" section of The New York Times.

== Life Before Birth ==
Bonnie Steinbock is the author of "Life Before Birth," published by Oxford University Press in 1992. As stated in the subtitle, the book discusses the "moral and legal status of embryos and fetuses." Chapter One goes into detail about the "interest view," the idea that all and only beings who have interests have moral status. The interest view is used to distinguish whose interests we are required to take into consideration. Besides the interest view, Steinbock touched on the legal status of the fetus. From prenatal injury torts, prenatal wrongful deaths, and criminal law, Steinbock gives details about each type of legislation surrounding the fetus. Steinbock further explains consciousness and nonconscious individuals and how that relates to interests. Chapters Two through Six build on the idea that beings with interests have moral status. These chapters discuss abortion, the legal status of the fetus, maternal-fetal conflict, fetal research, and embryo research.

== Views on animal pain ==
According to Steinbock, the pain of animals is a morally relevant consideration but is not morally decisive. This differs from Peter Singer's view that there is no essential difference between the pain of non-human animals and that of human beings, and also differs from William Baxter's view that animals have no moral consideration on their own whatsoever.

Also, she argues that there are morally good reasons for taking our own species as morally special, and thus the interests of non-human animals in relation to pain are not as important as those of human beings—though she admits those interests to be existent.

Furthermore, Steinbock affirms speciesism. For her, humans are more important than non-human animals, though non-human animals, in their own right, have moral status because they have interests of their own. Beings without interests of their own (e.g., plants, wilderness areas, species, works of art, embryos) do not have moral status, but may have moral value, if there are moral reasons to protect or preserve them. These reasons do not stem from their interests, since they do not have any interests of their own, and so are not "golden-rule type" reasons, but may be morally very important.

Steinbock has stated that "We do not subject animals to different moral treatment simply because they have fur and feathers, but because they are in fact different from human beings in ways that could be morally relevant".

== Selected publications ==
- Speciesism and the Idea of Equality (1978)
- Life Before Birth: The Moral and Legal Status of Embryos and Fetuses (1992)
- Killing and Letting Die (with Alastair Norcross, 1994)
- The Oxford Handbook of Bioethics (2007)
