= Worth Square =

Public square in Manhattan, New York City

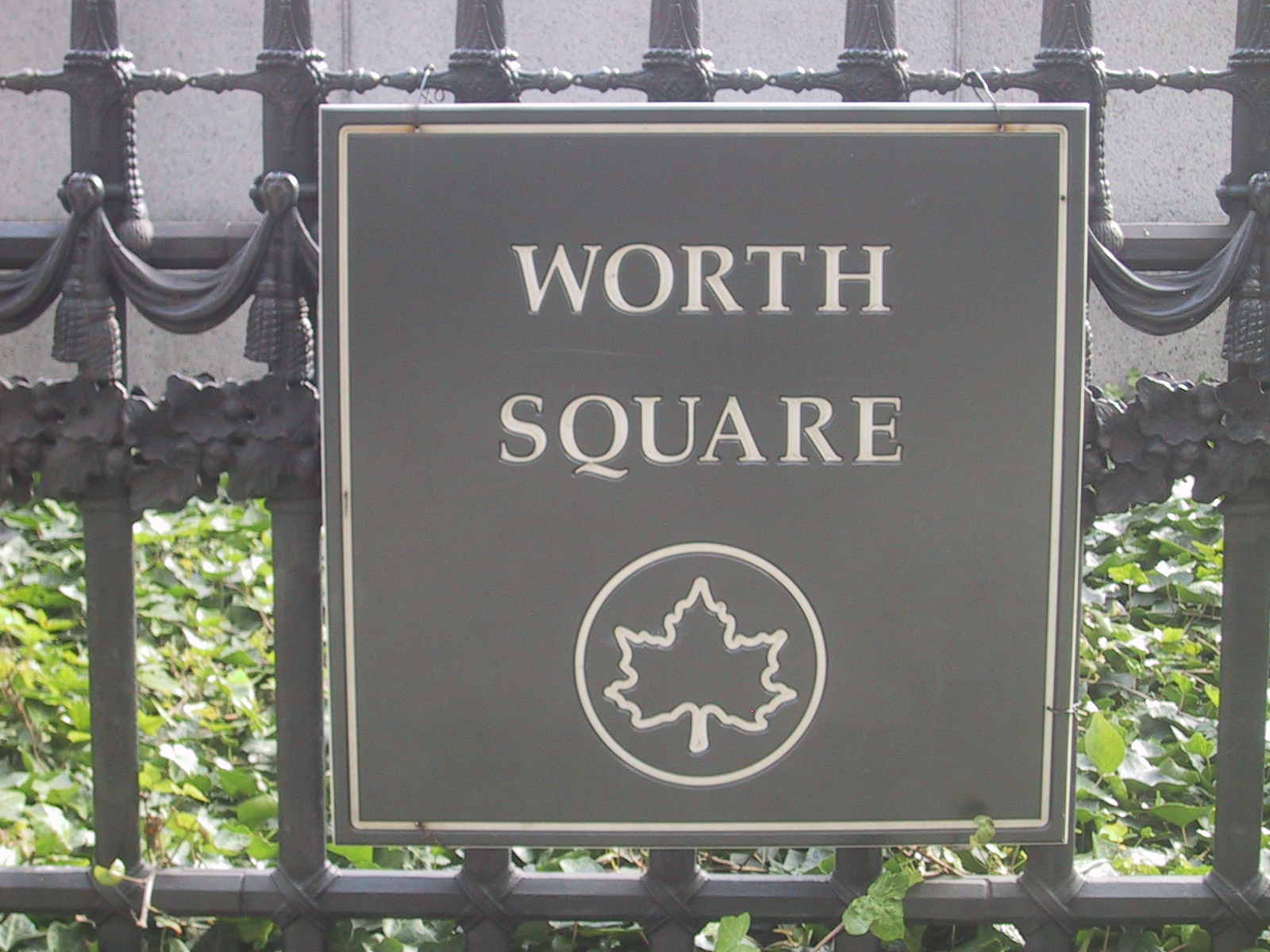
- Park signage
- Interactive map of Worth Square
- Location: Manhattan, New York City, New York, U.S.
- Coordinates: 40.74273°N 73.989°W
- Area: 0.27 acres (0.11 ha)

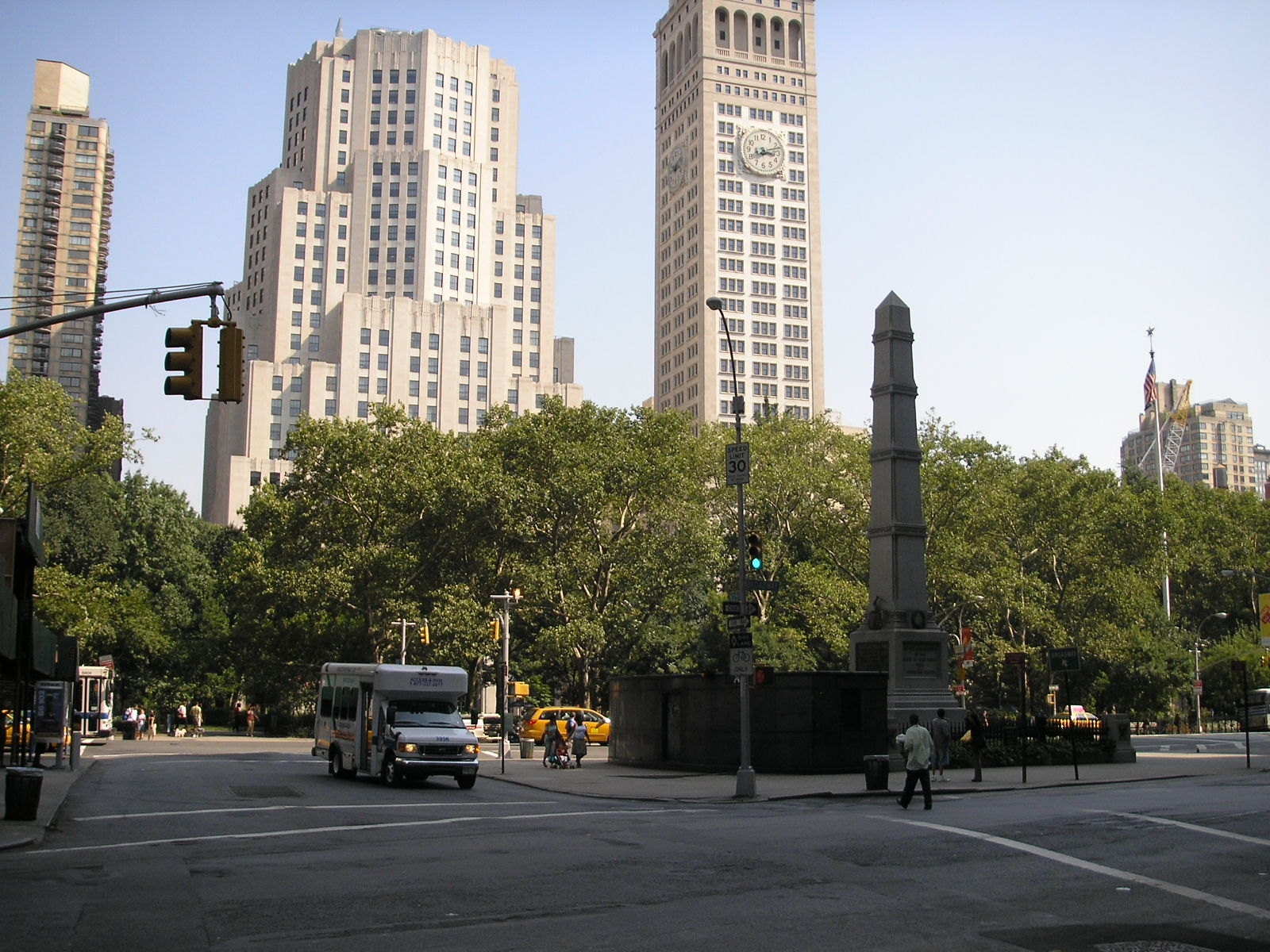
Part of the park and the General William Jenkins Worth Monument in 2007

Worth Square, or General Worth Square, is a public square in Manhattan located at East 25th Street between Broadway and Fifth Avenue directly west of Madison Square Park. The location was designated as a public park in 1847, and since 1857 the square has served as both a memorial to and the burial site of William Jenkins Worth. The only other New York City monument that doubles as a mausoleum is Grants Tomb in Harlem. The 0.27 acre square is one of the many Triangle/Plazas administered by the New York City Department of Parks and Recreation.

== History ==
Worth's monument, which was erected in 1857, was one of the first to be erected in a city park since the statue of George III was removed from Bowling Green in 1776. The city's second-oldest monument, it is the only one in the city except for Grant's Tomb that doubles as a mausoleum.

In spring 2017, as part of a capital reconstruction of Worth Square, Broadway between 24th and 25th Street was converted to a "shared street" where through vehicles are banned and delivery vehicles are restricted to 5 miles per hour (8.0 km/h). The capital project expands on a 2008 initiative where part of the intersection of Broadway and Fifth Avenue was repurposed into a public plaza, simplifying that intersection. As part of the 2017 project, Worth Square was expanded, converting the adjoining block of Broadway into a "shared street."

== See also ==
- List of city squares
