= Capt. Sylvester Baxter House =

Historic house in Massachusetts, United States

- U.S. National Register of Historic Places
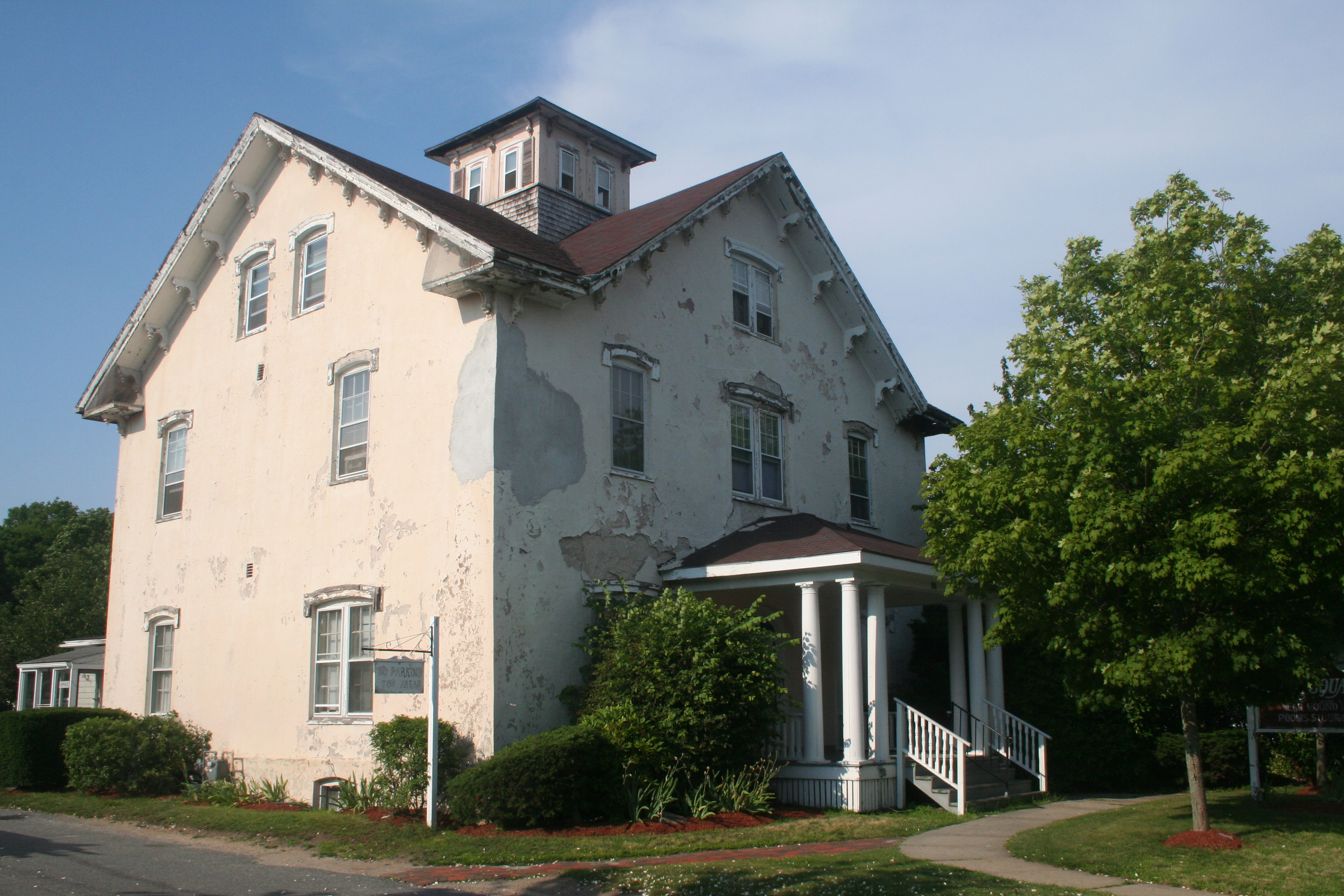

- Location within Cape Cod Location within Massachusetts Location within the United States
- Location: 156 Main Street, Hyannis, Massachusetts
- Coordinates: 41°39′19″N 70°16′39″W
- Built: 1855
- Architectural style: Italian Villa
- MPS: Barnstable MRA
- NRHP reference No.: 87000313
- Added to NRHP: March 13, 1987

The Capt. Sylvester Baxter House is a historic house in Barnstable, Massachusetts. The 2 1/2-story wood frame Italianate house was built c. 1855 by Captain Sylvester Baxter, a politically prominent local ship's captain. The house exterior has been stuccoed, and the roof is a cross-gable style with a square cupola on top. The eaves of the roof and cupola are studded with decorative brackets. The windows are topped by stilted segmented arches. The front entrance is sheltered by a hip-roofed porch supported by clusters of round columns.

The house was listed on the National Register of Historic Places in 1987.

== See also ==
- National Register of Historic Places listings in Barnstable County, Massachusetts
