= Baxter, Pennsylvania =

Unincorporated community in Pennsylvania, US

Coordinates: 41°08′04″N 79°08′59″W

Baxter is an unincorporated community in Jefferson County, in the U.S. state of Pennsylvania.

== History ==
A post office was established at Baxter in 1875, and remained in operation until 1967. The community was named for Richard J. Baxter, who owned a sawmill there.
