= General William Jenkins Worth Monument =

Monument in Manhattan, New York, U.S.

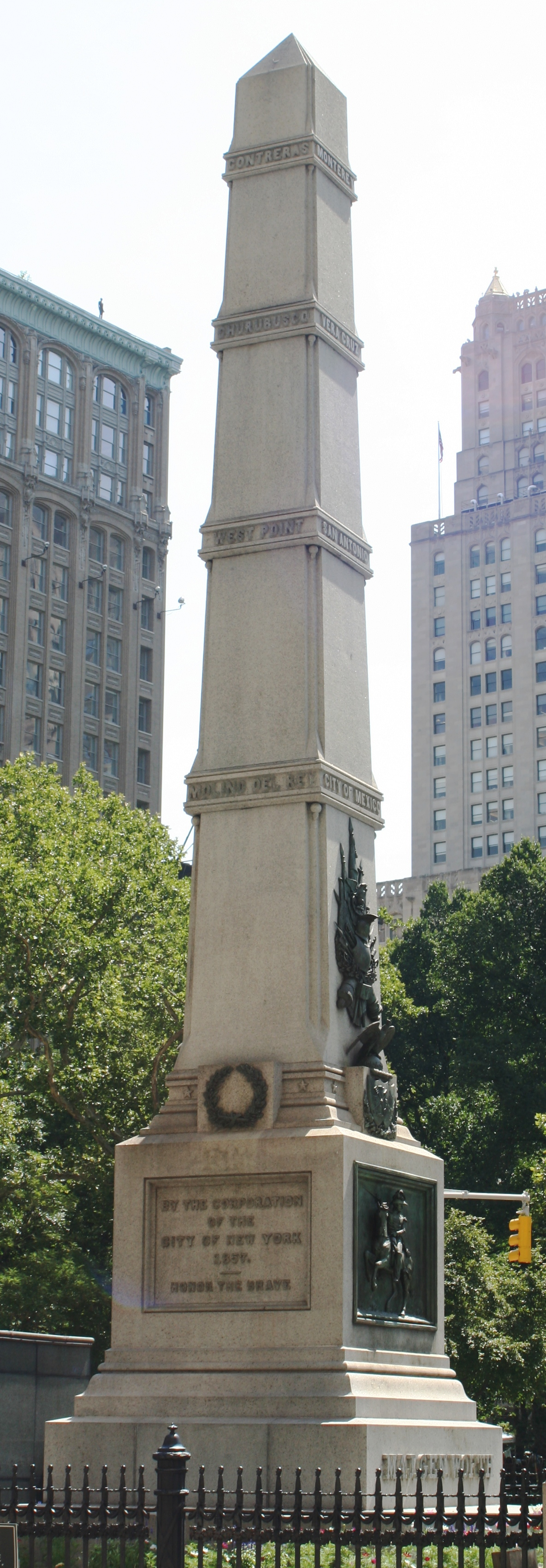
- The monument in 2010
- Artist: James G. Batterson
- Year: 1857
- Medium: Granite obelisk
- Location: New York City, New York, U.S.; 40.74276°N 73.988974°W

The General William Jenkins Worth Monument is a granite obelisk by James G. Batterson, installed in Manhattan's Worth Square, in the U.S. state of New York.

== Description and history ==
The memorial was cast c. 1857 and dedicated on November 25, 1857. This was the anniversary of evacuation day, the day that the British departed from the American colonies.

=== Inscriptions ===
One of the monument's inscriptions reads:

MAJOR GENERAL / WILLIAM JENKINS WORTH / 1794–1849 / WILLIAM J. WORTH, BORN IN HUDSON, N.Y. / BEGAN HIS MILITARY CAREER IN THE WAR OF 1812, / AND FROM 1820–1828 WAS COMMANDANT OF CADETS AT WEST POINT. / IN THE MEXICAN-AMERICAN WAR, HE DISTINGUISHED HIMSELF / IN BATTLES INSCRIBED ON THIS MONUMENT. / BREVETTED A MAJOR GENERAL IN 1846, WE WAS AWARDED A / CONGRESSIONAL SWORD OF HONOR IN 1847. / WORTH WAS ARMY COMMANDER OF THE DEPARTMENT OF TEXAS, / WHEN CHOLERA TOOK HIS LIFE IN 1849. / NAMED IN HIS HONOR ARE FORT WORTH, TEXAS; / LAKE WORTH, FLORIDA; AND WORTH STREET IN LOWER MANHATTAN. // DEDICATED 1857 / JAMES GOODWIN BATTERSON, ARCHITECT / MONUMENT AND TOMB ARE QUINCY GRANITE AND BRONZE / CAST-IRON FENCE REPLICATES THE CONGRESSIONAL SWORD // RESTORATION IN 1995 MADE POSSIBLE BY / THE PAUL AND KLARA PORZELT FOUNDATION AND/ JAMES A. WOODRUFF, JR., COMMANDER USN (RET.), / GREAT-GREAT-GRANDSON OF MAJOR GENERAL WORTH, / AND OTHER PRIVATE DONATIONS / THROUGH THE ADOPT-A-MONUMENT PROGRAM SPONSORED BY / THE MUNICIPAL ART SOCIETY, / ART COMMISSION OF THE CITY OF NEW YORK, / CITY OF NEW YORK / PARKS & RECREATION. / PERPETUAL MAINTENANCE ENDOWMENT FUNDED BY / JAMES A. WOODRUFF, JR., COMMANDER, USN (RET.)

During the 1860s, 1870s and 1880s, undergraduate students of Columbia College used the Worth Monument as the starting point of their annual Burial of the Ancients parade and bonfire, which marked the end of the academic year in the lead up to graduation.

== See also ==
- 1857 in art
