= Baxter, California =

Unincorporated community in California, United States

Baxter
- Unincorporated community
- Location in California Baxter (the United States)
- Coordinates: 39°12′47″N 120°46′52″W
- Country: United States
- State: California
- County: Placer
- Elevation: 3,891 ft (1,186 m)

Baxter is an unincorporated community in Placer County, California. Baxter is located 3 miles (4.8 km) east of Dutch Flat. It lies at an elevation of 3891 feet (1186 m).

Baxter started as a travelers' rest stop on the Lincoln Highway, later US 40. Food, lodging, and gasoline were available at the site, which remained a service stop into the 1980s. Baxter was also the point at which US 40 was closed over Donner Pass during heavy snow. The townsite was destroyed by a wildfire in 1998.

The Baxter post office opened in 1935.
