= Charles L. Baxter House =

Historic house in Massachusetts, United States

- U.S. National Register of Historic Places
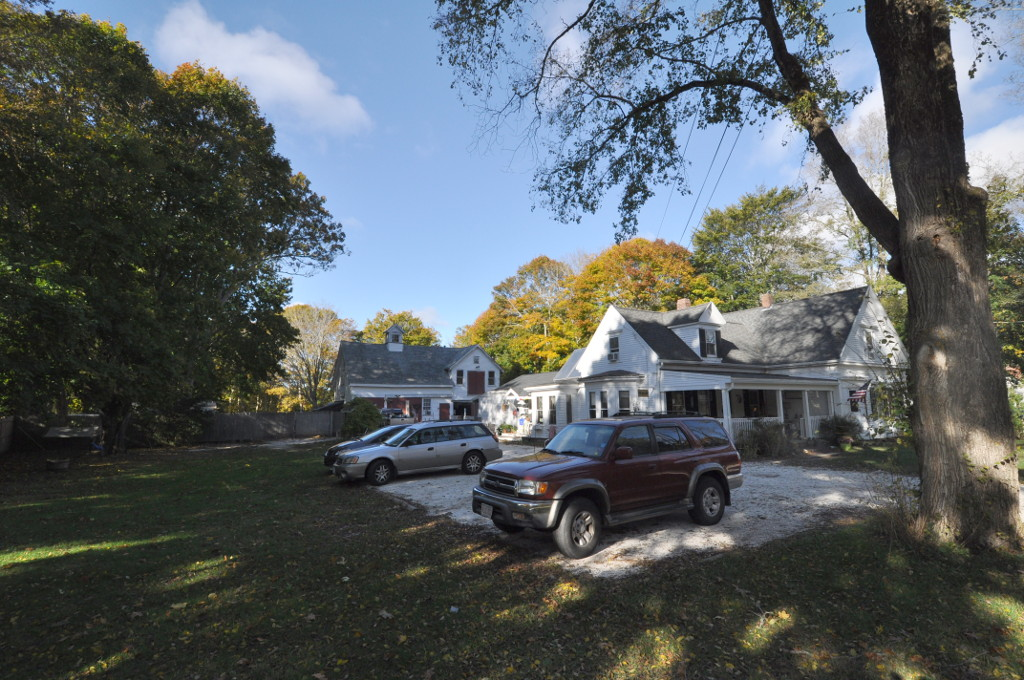

- Location within Cape Cod Location within Massachusetts Location within the United States
- Location: 77 Main St., Barnstable, Massachusetts
- Coordinates: 41°38′8″N 70°27′2″W
- Built: 1858
- Architect: Baxter, Charles L.
- Architectural style: Greek Revival
- MPS: Barnstable MRA
- NRHP reference No.: 87000315
- Added to NRHP: March 13, 1987

The Charles L. Baxter House is a historic house located at 77 Main Street in Barnstable, Massachusetts.

== Description and history ==
The 1 1/2-story Greek Revival wood-frame house was built c. 1858 by Charles L. Baxter, a local housewright who then lived there until his death. The house has an L-shaped layout, with the front entrance on the front of the main block, and a porch in the crook of the L. The house's corners are decorated with pilasters, as is the front door entry, which is topped by an entablature and lintel shelf.

The house was listed on the National Register of Historic Places on March 13, 1987.

== See also ==
- National Register of Historic Places listings in Barnstable County, Massachusetts
