= Baxter Mill =

- U.S. National Register of Historic Places
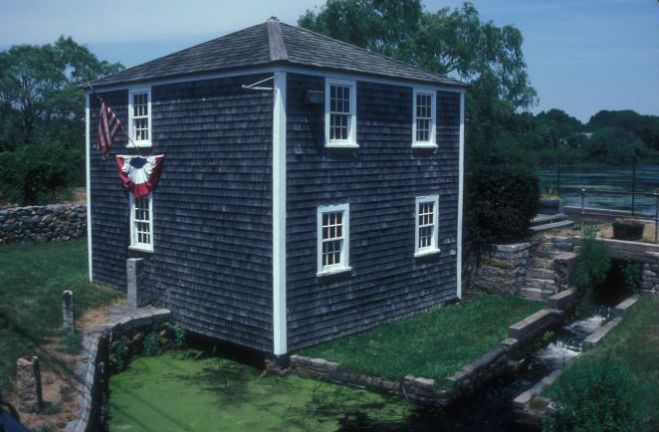
- Baxter Mill

- Location within Cape Cod Location within Massachusetts Location within the United States
- Location: MA 28, West Yarmouth, Massachusetts
- Coordinates: 41°39′38″N 70°15′42″W
- Built: 1710; expanded 1860; restored 1961
- NRHP reference No.: 81000120
- Added to NRHP: August 27, 1981

The Baxter Mill is a historic gristmill on Massachusetts Route 28 in West Yarmouth, Massachusetts. Built about 1710 and restored to working order in 1961, it is the only surviving 18th-century water-powered mill on Cape Cod. It is now a museum property owned by the town and operated by the Yarmouth Historical Commission. The mill was listed on the National Register of Historic Places in 1981.

== Description and history ==
The Baxter Mill stands west of the village center of West Yarmouth, on a narrow strip of land between Massachusetts Route 28 to the south and Mill Pond to the north, between Baxter Street and Mill Pond Road. The mill is a small wood frame two-story building, about 20 feet (6.1 m) square, with a hip roof and shingled exterior. It is set in an area that has partly defined by a low stone retaining wall on the north and east sides, and the stone-lined exit channel from the pond.

The mill was built c. 1710 by John and Shubel Baxter. The mill was originally powered by an externally mounted wheel, typical for the period but subject to damage from winter conditions. The mill was renovated in 1860, in which the exterior waterwheel was replaced with an internal turbine. It remained in operation until the turn of the 20th century. The building was restored to working order in 1961 (as discussed by A. Harold Castonguay, one of the restorers, in his book Two men on a mill: The story of the restoration of Baxter's mill), including creation of a replica of the turbine. The 1860 turbine remains on site as part of the museum display. The mill was given to the town, and is operated by the Yarmouth Historical Commission as a museum on a seasonal basis.

== See also ==
- National Register of Historic Places listings in Barnstable County, Massachusetts
