= Baxter, Georgia =

- Unincorporated community
- Location within the state of Georgia Baxter, Georgia (the United States)
- Coordinates: 34°44′19″N 84°04′29″W
- Country: United States
- State: Georgia
- County: Union
- Elevation: 2,129 ft (649 m)
- Time zone: UTC-5 (Eastern (EST))
  - Summer (DST): UTC-4 (EDT)
- Area codes: 706 & 762
- GNIS ID: 331107

Baxter is an unincorporated community in Union County, in the U.S. state of Georgia.

== History ==
A post office called Baxter was established in 1900, and remained in operation until 1953. Baxter was located inland away from railroads.

In 1984 US Army Sgt. Major Ira T. Harkins retired from Fort Hood and purchased the land and moved there with his wife, Pauline Harkins and built a home where the boarding house once stood. The boarding house was moved adjacent to the Post Office building, where both still stand to this day as private property.
