= Justice Baxter =

Justice Baxter may refer to:

- Elisha Baxter (1827–1899), chief justice of the Supreme Court of Arkansas
- Marvin R. Baxter (born 1940), associate justice of the Supreme Court of California
