= Shubael Baxter House =

Historic house in Massachusetts, United States

- U.S. National Register of Historic Places
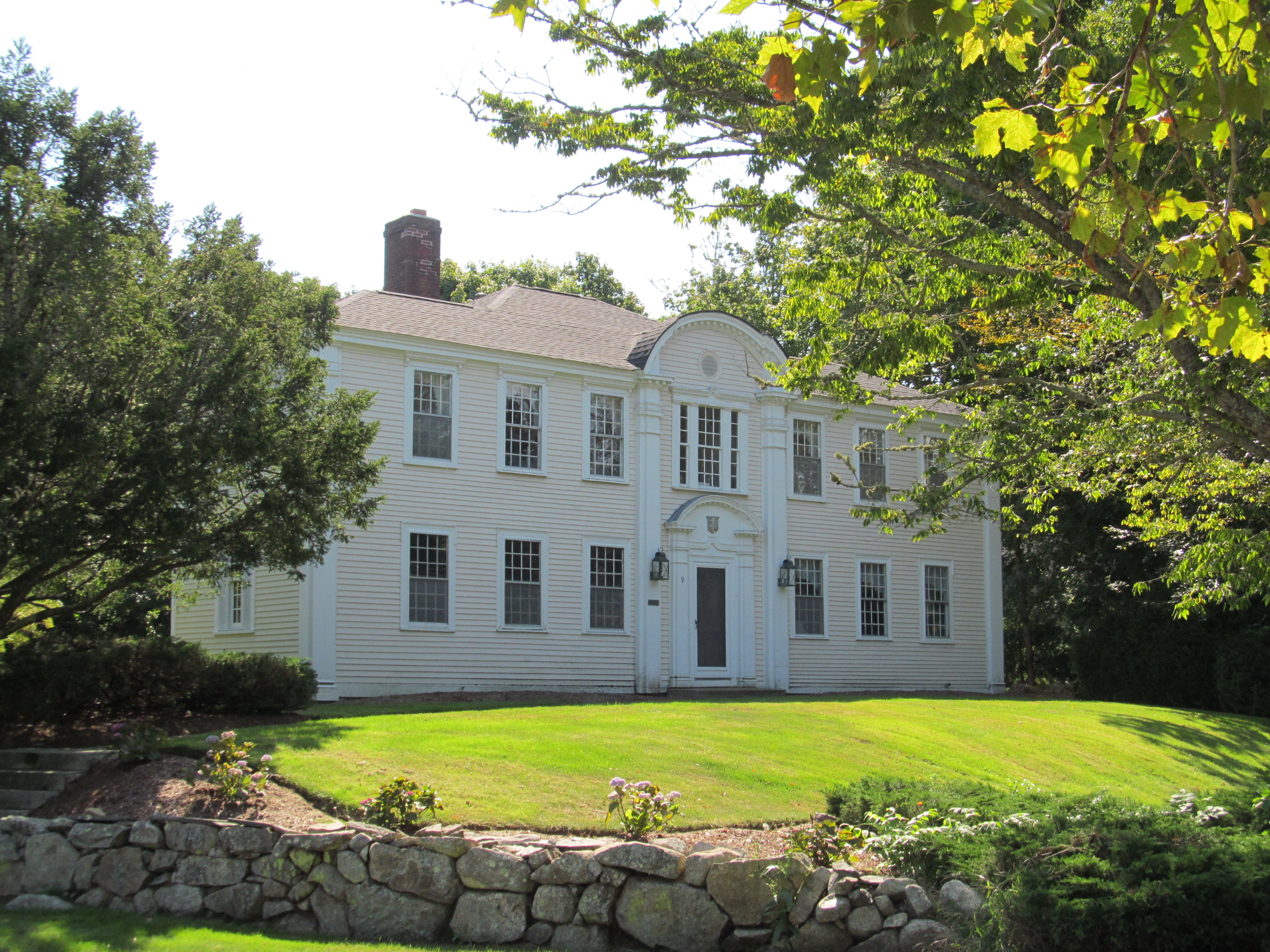
- Shubael Baxter House

- Location within Cape Cod Location within Massachusetts Location within the United States
- Location: 9 E. Bay Road, Barnstable, Massachusetts
- Coordinates: 41°37′39″N 70°22′49″W
- Built: 1829
- Architectural style: Colonial Revival, Federal
- MPS: Barnstable MRA
- NRHP reference No.: 87000304
- Added to NRHP: September 18, 1987

The Shubael Baxter House is a historic house in Barnstable, Massachusetts. Built c. 1829 by a ship's captain, it underwent a major transformation into a Colonial Revival mansion in the early 20th century. It was listed on the National Register of Historic Places in 1987 for its architectural significance.

== Description and history ==
The Baxter House is set prominently facing northeast at the southwest corner of Main Street and East Bay Road in the Osterville section of Barnstable. It is a large two story wood-frame structure, seven bays wide, with a stepped hip roof, clapboard siding, and corner quoining. Its dominant feature is a monumental entrance portico, which rises to form a rounded and dentillated arch at the roof line. The portico is defined by two-story pilasters, with the entry on the first floor also flanked by single-story pilasters and topped by a round-arch pediment. A large three-part window fills the second story above the entry; other windows on the facade are 12/12 sash.

When the house was built c. 1829 by Captain Shubael Baxter, it was a more conventional Federal style structure, five bays wide. Later owners include another ship captain and a surgeon who served in the American Civil War. The Colonial Revival alterations, which included extending the width by two bays and construction of the portico, are attributed to J. S. Twombley, who is recorded as the house's owner in 1907. The house was listed on the National Register of Historic Places in 1987.

== See also ==
- National Register of Historic Places listings in Barnstable County, Massachusetts
