= Baxter LePage =

Baxter
- Paul LePage (right) and Baxter (left)
- Other name: Snickers (pre-2008)
- Species: Canis lupus familiaris
- Breed: Jack Russel Terrier
- Sex: Male
- Born: c. 2005; Florida
- Died: March 29, 2016 (aged 10–11); Augusta, Maine, U.S.
- Years active: 2011–2016
- Known for: Former first dog of Maine
- Owner: Paul LePage
- http://baxterblogs.wordpress.com

Baxter (c. 2005 – March 29, 2016) was the former first dog of Maine who greeted visitors of the Blaine House.

Baxter, a Jack Russel Terrier mix, was adopted by Paul LePage's daughter Lauren LePage in 2008 from an animal shelter in Florida. The LePage family changed his name from the shelter-given name "Snickers" to "Baxter" following adoption. He moved to the Blaine House in 2011 when Paul LePage became Governor of Maine. Baxter often welcomed daily visitors of the Blaine House, many of which were children.

Baxter was also the subject of a blog written by Paula Benoit from April 2011 to June 2012, Blaine House Director and Assistant, to interest viewers in the Blaine House's history and current events. Each post featured photos of Baxter maintaining his role in the Blaine House, sometimes accompanied by text simulating Baxter's viewpoint on a Blaine House event. Baxter was also the subject of the book Baxter in the Blaine House and two Facebook pages, each simulating Baxter's viewpoint on events.

He died from cancer at age 11 on March 29, 2016. His death was announced by Brent Littlefield, Paul LePage's political adviser, a day later.
