= Baxter Street Historic District =

Historic district in Massachusetts, United States

- U.S. National Register of Historic Places
- U.S. Historic district
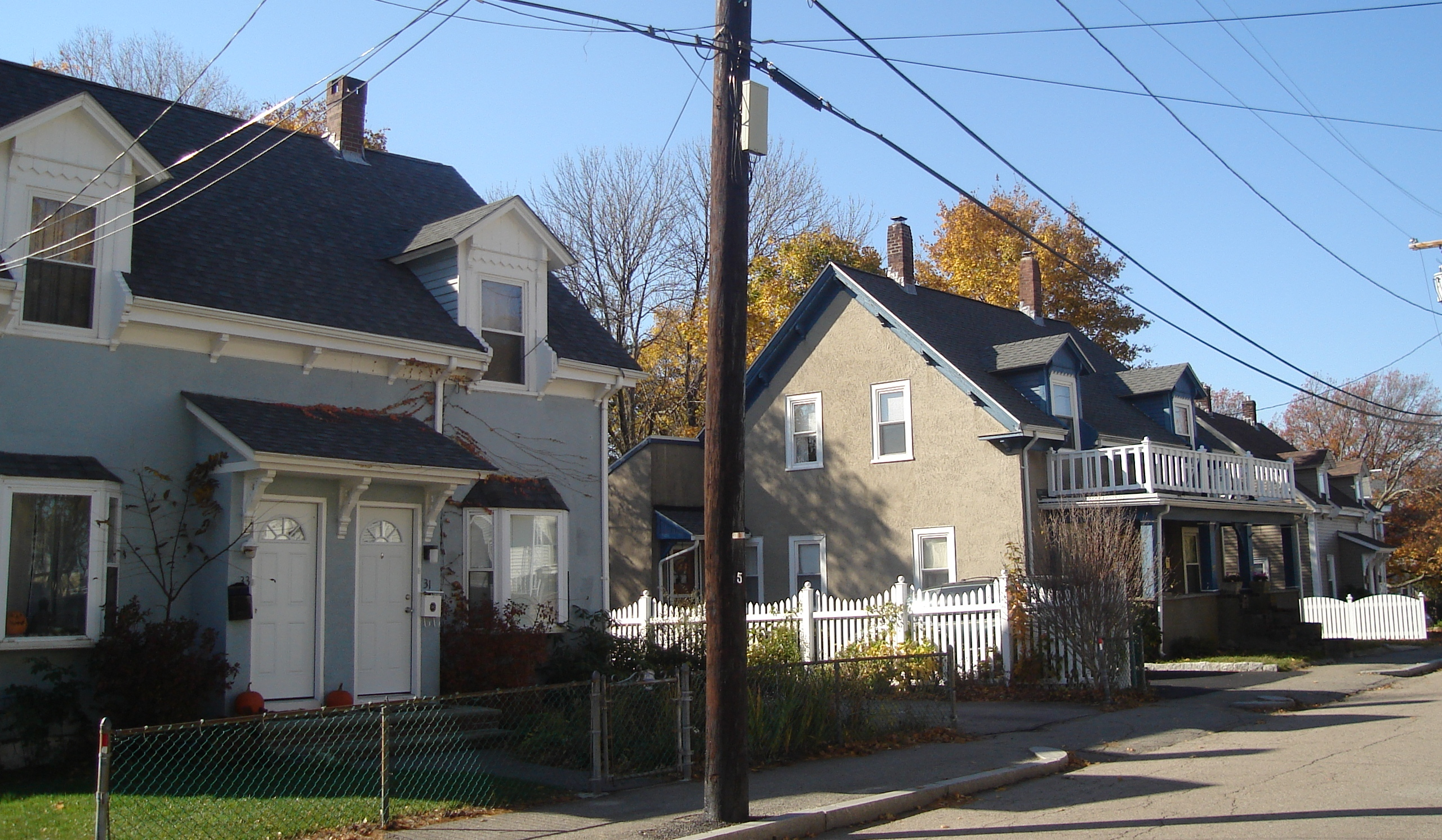
- Baxter Street Historic District

- Location within Massachusetts Location within the United States
- Location: Roughly 19-34 Baxter St., Quincy, Massachusetts
- Coordinates: 42°14′58″N 70°59′57″W
- Area: less than one acre
- Architectural style: Quincy Cottage
- MPS: Quincy MRA
- NRHP reference No.: 89001309
- Added to NRHP: September 20, 1989

The Baxter Street Historic District is a residential historic district roughly at 19-34 Baxter Street in Quincy, Massachusetts. It encompasses an enclave of four duplex worker housing units of a type called the "Quincy Cottage", which were built in the 1880s for workers in a locally important shoe manufacturing company. The district was listed on the National Register of Historic Places in 1989.

== Description and history ==
Baxter Street is located in a densely-built residential area east of Quincy Center, south of Washington Street and east of Revere Street. It was laid out on a farm previously owned by Josiah Baxter. John E. Drake established a shoe factory a short way east of these houses in the 1870s (near the corner of Parmenter Place), and was employing 250 workers by the 1880s. He built the four duplexes in this district in the 1880s to provide residential space for some of his workers.

The four duplexes are all wood-frame structures, of a type called a "Quincy Cottage" which were once quite numerous in the city. The basic form is a 1 1/2-story rectangular block, with a projecting entrance and a pair of gabled dormers in the roof. This district includes 19–21, 25–27, 26–28, and 32-24 Baxter Street. Stylistically they represent several subtypes of the form, with some finished in clapboards and others in stucco. The presence and configuration of porches varies, as do added stylistic details such as bracketing in the eaves and the shape and size of dormers. All have gabled dormers framed by carved brackets.

== See also ==
- National Register of Historic Places listings in Quincy, Massachusetts
