= May Chen =

American labor advocate

May Ying Chen
- Born: 1948 (age 77–78); Boston
- Education: Radcliffe College; UCLA
- Occupation: labor organizer
- Children: 2

May Ying Chen (born 1948) is an American labor organizer and advocate for immigrant workers. Before retiring in 2009, she was an officer and founding member of the AFL–CIO's Asian Pacific American Labor Alliance (APALA), and the International Vice President of UNITE HERE.

== Biography ==
Chen was born and raised in the suburbs of Boston. She earned a BA from Radcliffe College and a master's degree in Education at UCLA. While living in California from 1970 to 1979, she taught high school and adult education classes, taught Asian and Asian-American studies at California State University, Long Beach, and founded a daycare center in L.A.'s Chinatown.

Chen moved to New York City with her husband and two children in 1979. She was working for the Chinese Committee of Local 6 (the Hotel, Restaurant, Club Employees and Bartenders Union) at the time of the 1982 garment workers' strike in New York's Chinatown. Inspired by the strike, she joined the International Ladies' Garment Workers' Union (ILGWU) in 1983 and began working on the ILGWU Immigration Project in 1984. The Immigration Project, which helped thousands of ILGWU members apply for U.S. citizenship, was the first union-created legal advocacy department for immigrant members. She began working full-time for ILGWU's Education Department in 1989. She also worked with other labor organizations, serving on the Asian Labor Committee of the New York City Central Labor Council, the National Executive Board of the Coalition of Labor Union Women, and as an officer and founding member of the AFL–CIO's Asian Pacific American Labor Alliance (APALA). She went on to become International Vice President of UNITE HERE, manager of the ILGWU Local 23-25, and secretary of the New York Metropolitan Area Joint Board.
