= Katie Quan =

American academic and former labor leader

- Occupation: labor organizer

Katie Quan is a senior fellow at the UC Berkeley Center for Labor Research and Education, a former chair of the center, and a former labor organizer. In 1982, she was one of the organizers of the historic garment workers' strike in New York City's Chinatown.

== Biography ==
Quan was born and raised in San Francisco. In 1975, she moved to New York City, where she worked as a seamstress in a Chinatown garment factory. After joining the International Ladies' Garment Workers' Union Local 23–25, she became active in the union, organizing work stoppages to negotiate better prices for piece work. In 1982, she helped organize the successful garment workers' strike.

=== 1982 garment workers' strike ===
Quan, herself a worker at one of Chinatown's largest garment shops, wrote in to a Chinese community newspaper, Sing Tao Daily in advance of the strike to garner media attention for the cause. She encouraged workers to strike alongside the union and included her phone number. She received a high volume of calls in response, which furthered her organization efforts.

During the strike, 20,000 garment workers, most of whom were Asian American women, marched through New York's Chinatown to Columbus Park (Manhattan) calling for the renewal of union contracts. They wore matching union caps and carried English and Chinese signs encouraging support of the union. As a result of the strike, nearly all of the Chinatown garment manufacturers who previously refused to sign union contracts agreed to do so, leading to improved working conditions and wage increases. The 1982 strike also resulted in some improvements to the relationship between members of the union and union leaders, as well as an increase in community services. The union employed more bilingual staff to provide Chinese and Spanish translations of their communications. The union also offered more English classes, immigration support services, health services, and childcare resources.

=== Later labor rights activism ===
Quan went on to become the international vice president of the ILGWU, and its successor, the Union of Needletrades, Industrial and Textile Employees (UNITE).

In 1992, she chaired the founding convention of the Asian Pacific American Labor Alliance. She began working for the Labor Center in 1998, eventually serving as chair and associate chair, and in 2000 became a governing board member of the Worker Rights Consortium. She co-founded the International Center for Joint Labor Research at Sun Yat-sen University in Guangzhou, China in 2010, and co-directed the center for four years. She received a Fulbright grant in 2014 to study China's apparel supply chain at Peking University.

Quan contributed a chapter, Women Crossing Borders to Organize, in “The Sex of Class: Women Transforming American Labor,” edited by D.S. Cobble and published in 2007 by Cornell University Press. She focused on three labor organizing campaigns that had not been comprehensively studied before including a Sara Lee garment factory in Mexico that involved a campaign asking consumers to pay 10 cents more per garment in exchange for Sara Lee agreeing to pay the workers a minimum of $10 per day. The other campaigns involved Tainan Enterprises apparel manufacturer and Securitas security services. In each case, international support was key to labor's success.

In 1995, Quan was one of four honored by the San Francisco League of Women Voters for her contribution to the community and her leadership.

== Personal life ==
Quan was married to Richard Leung, former President of SEIU Janitors Union Local 87 and a board member of the San Francisco Labor Council for many years, until his death in 2015.
