= Asian Pacific American Labor Alliance =

U.S. AFL–CIO constituency group

APALA
- Asian Pacific American Labor Alliance
- Founded: May 1, 1992
- Headquarters: Washington, D.C.
- Location: United States
- Key people: Ligaya Domingo, president
- Affiliations: AFL–CIO
- Website: www.apalanet.org

The Asian Pacific American Labor Alliance (APALA) is a nonprofit organization of Asian-Pacific American trade union members affiliated with the AFL–CIO. It was the "first and only national organization for Asian Pacific American union members".

In the late 1980s and early 1990s, a number of AFL–CIO affiliates became concerned with sweatshop work and child labor as a threat to American jobs. Campaigns against these practices, coupled several sweatshop and slave labor scandals in the United States, created a growing awareness within the federation of the plight of Asian-Pacific American workers. Independent worker groups such as the Asian Immigrant Women's Advocates in the San Francisco, California, the Korean Immigrant Workers Advocates in Los Angeles, California, and Workers' Awaaz and the Chinese Staff and Workers' Association in New York City also helped the federation see the need for an Asian-Pacific American labor organization.

The Asian Pacific American Labor Alliance was founded on May 1, 1992, when 500 Asian-Pacific American labor activists met to found a new national labor organization to give Asian and Pacific Islander workers a more effective voice within the AFL–CIO and on labor issues nationally. APALA's first president was Kent Wong. Its first executive director was Matthew Finucane. Katie Quan chaired the founding convention.

APALA is the official voice of the 500,000 Asian and Pacific Islander labor union members in the AFL–CIO, and has 13 chapters in the U.S. APALA has been credited with shifting the AFL–CIO toward more actively organizing Asian Pacific workers. It has a biennial membership convention, which meets in even-numbered years.

APALA has two main goals. First, it works with the AFL–CIO Organizing Institute to train Asian and Pacific Islander workers in organizing techniques, and assists member unions of the AFL–CIO in organizing these workers of similar ethnic and racial background. APALA also works to build awareness of the labor movement among Asian-Pacific American workers. Second, APALA works to build awareness of and address exploitative conditions in industries with large numbers of Asian-Pacific American workers, such as the garment, electronics, hotel and restaurant, food processing, and health care industries.

Most recently, APALA has been working with the Leadership Conference on Civil Rights and the National Asian Pacific American Legal Consortium to educate union members and the Asian-Pacific American community on affirmative action issues.

APALA is also active in voter registration, education and mobilization, and is active in federal and state legislative efforts on immigration reform and the access of immigrants (legal and illegal) to social services.

APALA's president is Ligaya Domingo, Racial Justice and Education Director for SEIU Healthcare 1199NW. Executive director Gloria Caoile stepped down in March 2008. Malcolm Amado Uno, APALA's Deputy Director since August 2007, was tapped to replace her. Uno was previously the National Organizing Director of Asian Pacific Islander American Vote (APIAVote) and Policy and Outreach Coordinator for Preschool California. The current executive director is Sandra Engle.

APALA is a member of the National Council of Asian Pacific Americans.
