= Workers' Voice =

Workers' Voice may refer to:

== Organisations ==
- Workers' Voice (SuperPAC), an American pro-union political action committee
- Workers' Awaaz or Workers' Voice, a female domestic workers' group in New York
- Lutte Ouvrière (Workers' Struggle), formerly Voix Ouvrière (Workers' Voice), a Trotskyist group in France
- Workers' Voice, also known as La Voz de los Trabajadores, a Trotskyist group in the United States.

== Publications ==
- Workers' Voice, publication of the trade union Bermuda Industrial Union
- Workers' Voice, publication of the Communist Party of Turkey (Workers Voice)
- Workers' Voice, former publication of the Communist Workers' Organisation (UK)
- Workers' Voice, publication of the Workers Organisation for Socialist Action in South Africa
- Workers' Voice, publication of the Communist Party of Iran
