= Bandits' Roost, 59 1/2 Mulberry Street =

1888 photograph by Jacob Riis

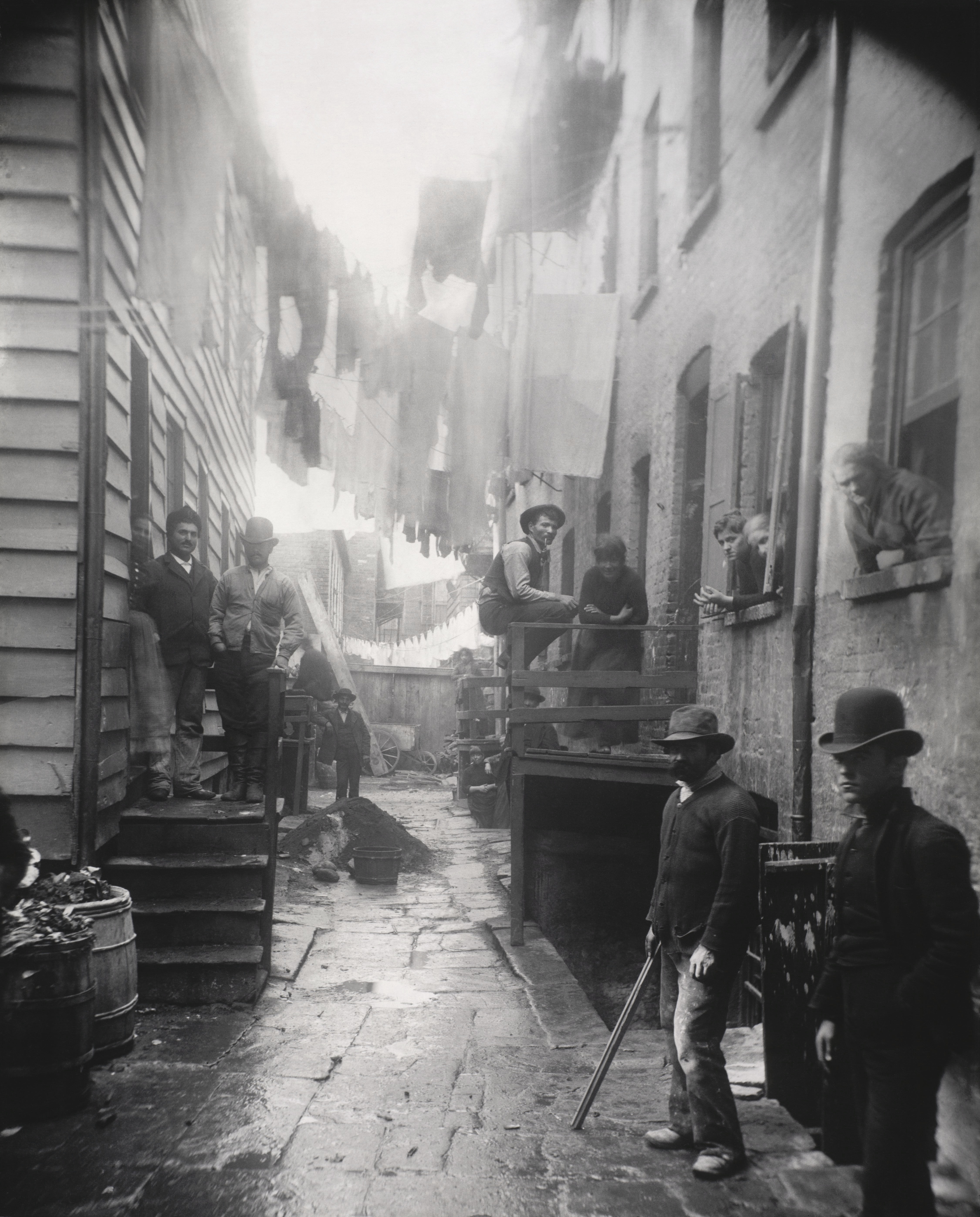
Bandits' Roost, 59 1/2 Mulberry Street (1888) by Jacob Riis

Bandits' Roost, 59 1/2 Mulberry Street is a black and white photograph produced by Danish-American photojournalist and social reformer Jacob Riis in 1888. The photograph was possibly not taken by Riis but instead by one of his assistant photographers, Henry G. Piffard or Richard Hoe Lawrence. It was first published in the photographic book How the Other Half Lives, in 1890, which aimed to document the social conditions of the poorest people of New York.

== Description ==
This photograph was taken in "The Bend," a dangerous and poor alley in Mulberry Street, in New York, that no longer exists.

The Bend was the core of the "city tenement slums", known for its crime ridden population of mostly Italian origin. Two men at the right appear to be guarding the entrance of the alley, the second from the right holding a piece of lumber, possibly as a club. The Art Story website claims that this potential weapon "heightens the sense of menace". Other people appear in the image, including a man who sits in a staircase railing near a woman, and another three men in the opposite side, looking in the direction of the camera. Some people lean from the windows, seemingly interested, at the right, while at the background clothing hangs on lines.

Riis's social activism in pursuit of better life conditions for the poorest classes of New York, of which the book where this picture was published was one of the best examples, was one of the factors that led to the demolition of Mulberry Bend, which was later replaced by a park.

== Cultural references ==
Riis' work served as an inspiration and this photograph in particular was recreated in a scene of the film Gangs of New York (2002), by Martin Scorsese, which takes place two decades before the photo was taken.

== Public collections ==
There are prints of this photograph at the Museum of Modern Art, in New York, the Museum of the City of New York, the International Center of Photography, in New York, and at the Ackland Art Museum, in Chapel Hill.

== See also ==
- List of photographs considered the most important
