= "I Scrubs" =

Photograph by Jacob Riis

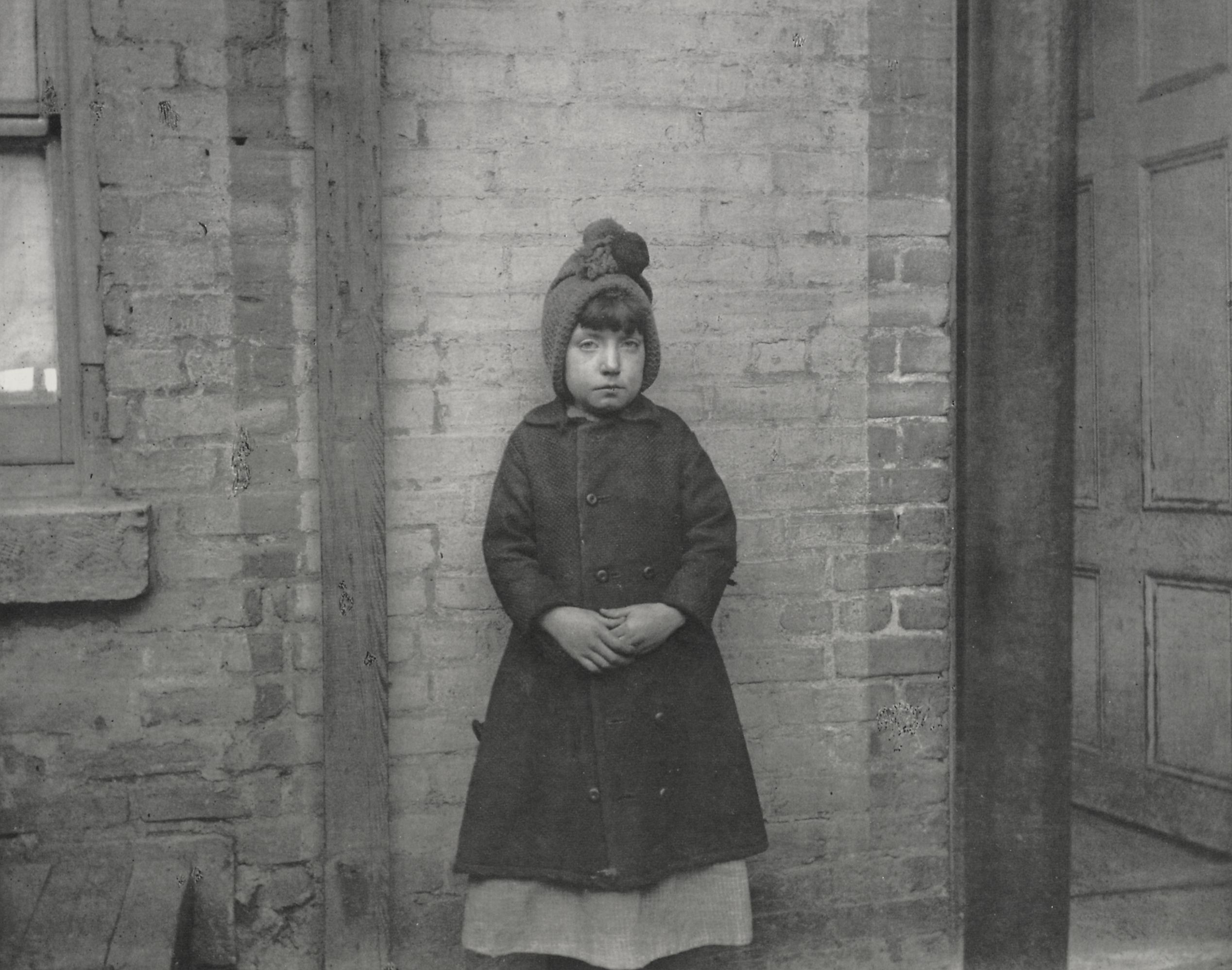
"I Scrubs" (c. 1890) by Jacob Riis

"I Scrubs", full title: "I scrubs." Little Katie from the W. 52nd Street Industrial School, is a black and white photograph taken by Danish American photographer and social reformer Jacob Riis, c. 1890. It was included in his second book, The Children of the Poor (1892), a follow-up to How the Other Half Lives (1890). This time Riis took aim at the poor children, specially those who were already working at a very young age. Similarly to the purpose of his previous book, Riis wanted to alert people to the creation of better conditions for the children of the poorer classes.

== History and description ==
Riis took a different approach for his second book, compared with the previous one. This time, instead of photographing people often without their permission, he took the opposite approach, getting to know and asking previously the children that he photographed. He calls some of the girls from his pictures, "little mothers", because despite their young age they already had responsibilities similar to grown ups.

Riis explains in his book that "little Katie", the girl depicted in this picture, lived at West Forty-ninth Street, in New York, and was 9 years old. She lived with her father and stepmother and already worked, like her three siblings, an older sister and two brothers. The photographer meet her at West 52nd Street Industrial School, a school for poor children. He explains: "The picture shows what a sober [serious], patient, sturdy little thing she was, with that dull life wearing on her day by day." Riis states that when she was asked to take the photograph at school, she accepted it, without questioning or smiling. He remembers that when he asked Katie what was her work, she answered: "I scrubs," (...) and her look guaranteed that what she scrubbed came out clean./ Katie was one of the little mothers whose work never ends. Very early the cross of her sex had been laid upon the little shoulders that bore it so stoutly. On the top floor of a tenement... she was keeping house for her older sister and two brothers, all of whom worked."

== Public collections ==
There are prints of this photograph at the Museum of the City of New York, the Museum of Modern Art, in New York, and at the International Center of Photography, in New York.
