= Statue of Sun Yat-sen (New York City) =

Statue in Manhattan, New York, U.S.

Dr. Sun Yat-sen
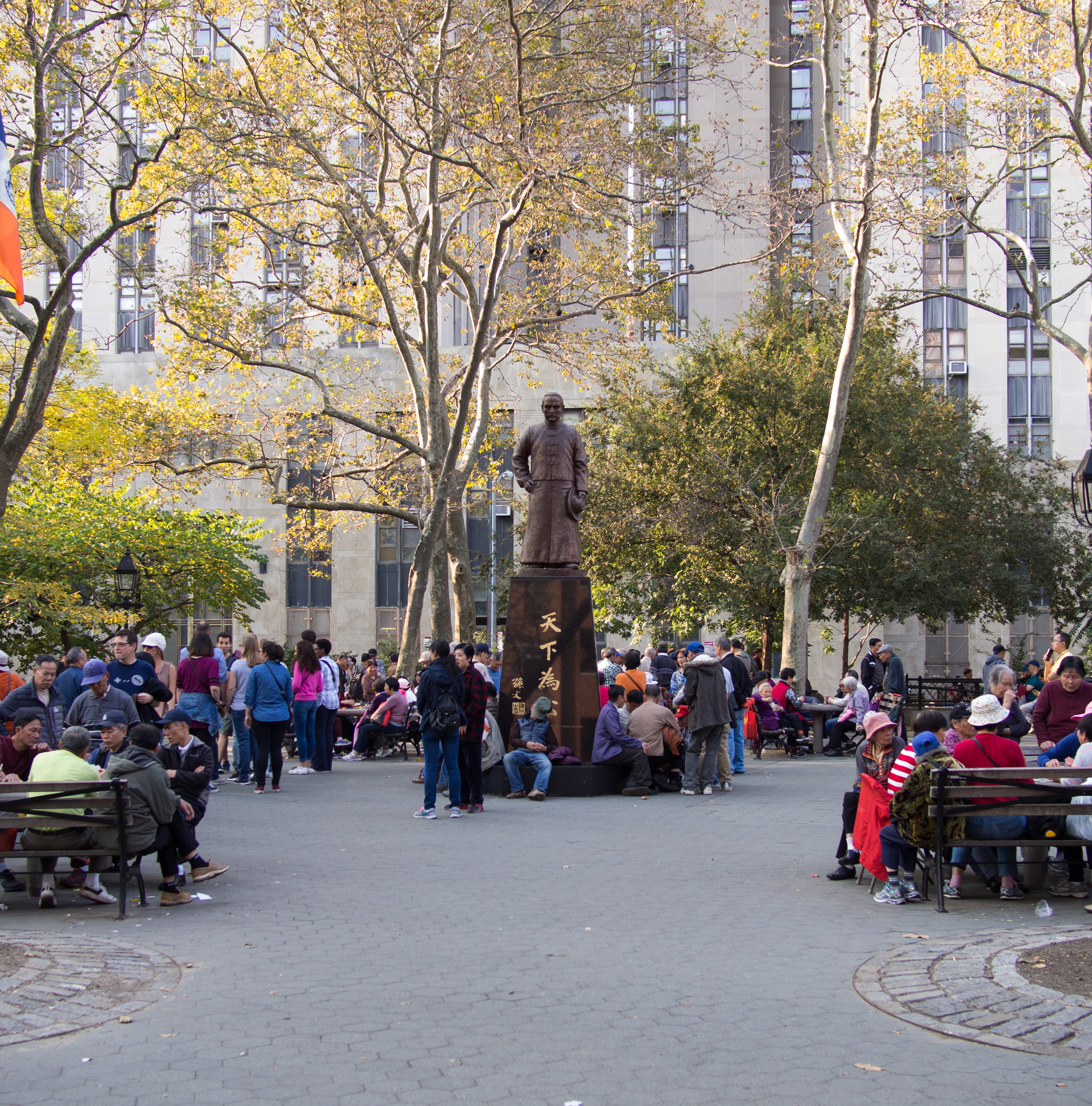
- The statue in 2016
- Artist: Lu Chun-Hsiung; Michael Kang
- Subject: Sun Yat-sen
- Location: New York City, New York, U.S.; 40°42′56.8″N 73°59′59.7″W

Dr. Sun Yat-sen is an outdoor statue of Sun Yat-sen by Lu Chun-Hsiung and Michael Kang, installed in Manhattan's Columbus Park, in the U.S. state of New York.
