= Lodgers in Bayard Street Tenement, Five Cents a Spot =

Photograph by Jacob Riis

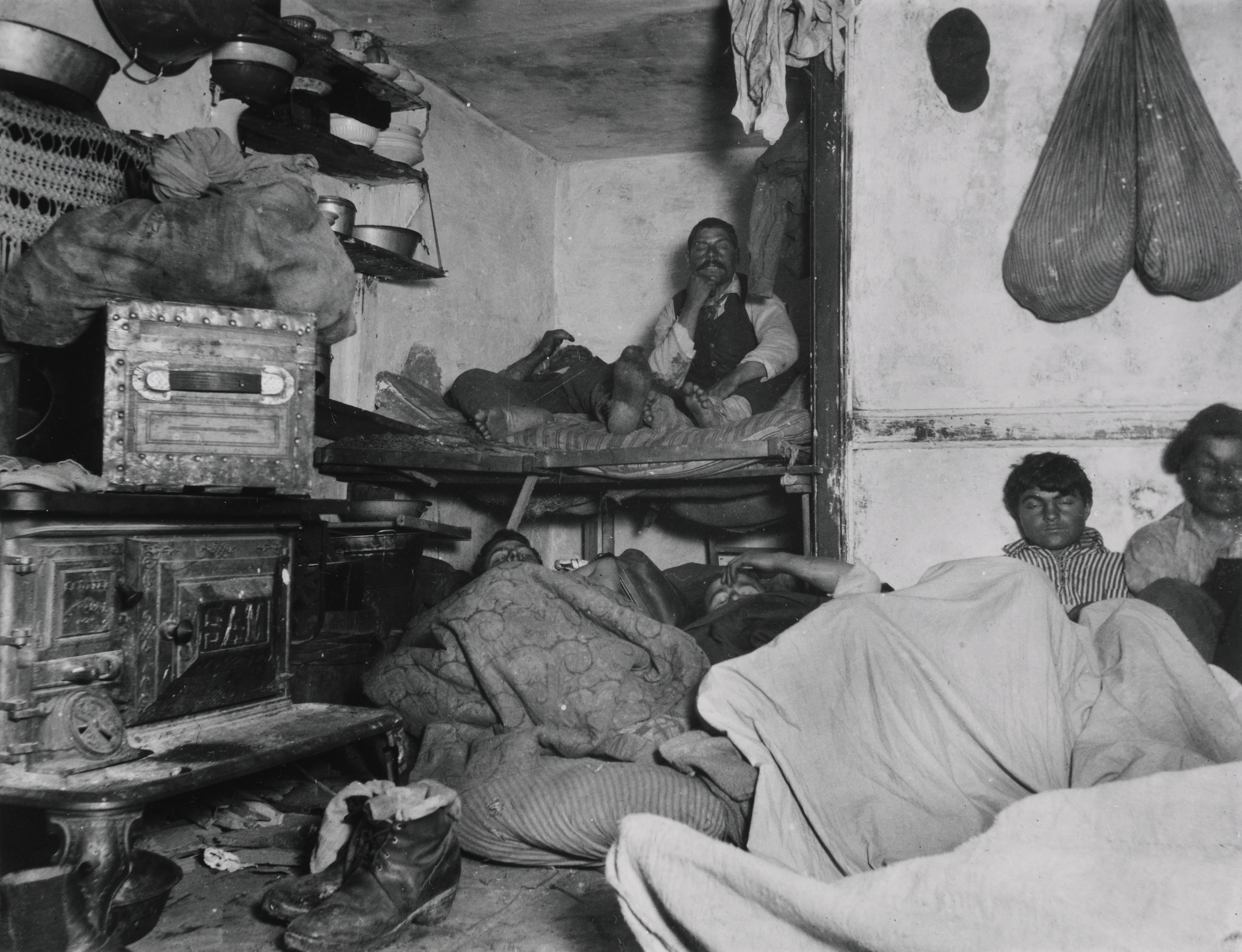
Lodgers in Bayard Street Tenement, Five Cents a Spot (1889) by Jacob Riis

Lodgers in Bayard Street Tenement, Five Cents a Spot is a black and white photograph taken by Danish-American photographer Jacob Riis, in 1889. It was included in his photographic book How the Other Half Lives, published in 1890.

== History and description ==
Riis documented the poor conditions of the lower classes of New York in his work. He took several pictures at night accompanying the police in a role that he called "a kind of war correspondent". He used magnesium flash photography, which allowed him to take pictures at night, and often controversially took them without permission of the people he captured on camera.

This photograph shows an overcrowded room of a tenement, with poor conditions of hygiene, and the people of the photograph were taken by surprise. The sanitary police intervened that night because the price of the beds was 5 cents, two cents below the minimum allowed by law. The picture depicts at least six people in very poor conditions and in a very narrow space, with a stove and several belongings visible. They appear sleepy and do not hide their surprise at being awakened at night. Riis himself describes the miserable conditions of the room:

In a room not thirteen feet either way slept twelve men and women, two or three in bunks set in a sort of alcove, the rest on the floor. A kerosene lamp burned dimly in the fearful atmosphere, probably to guide other and later arrivals to their beds, for it was only just past midnight. A baby's fretful wail came from an adjoining hall-room, where, in the semi-darkness, three recumbent figures could be made out. The apartment was one of three in two adjoining buildings we had found, within half an hour, similarly crowded.

Even sometimes with controversial methods, his photographic and journalistic work helped to create legislation that would allow better sanitary life conditions for the poorest classes.

== Public collections ==
There are prints of this photograph at the Museum of Modern Art, in New York, the Museum of the City of New York, the International Center of Photography, in New York, the San Francisco Museum of Modern Art, and the Library of Congress, in Washington, D.C.
