= Mulberry Bend =

Area in Manhattan, New York

Coordinates: 40°42′54.30″N 73°59′58.78″W

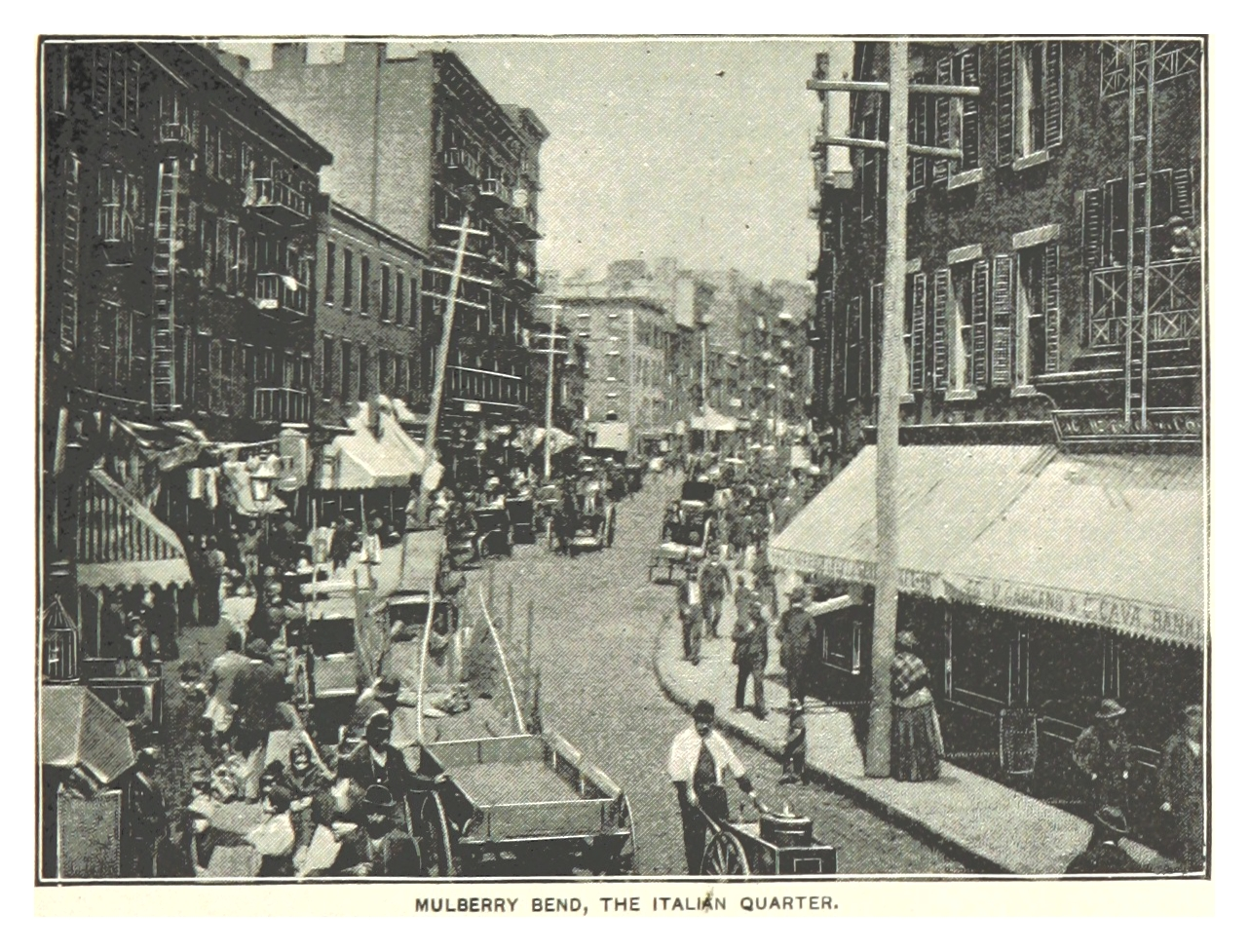
Mulberry Street looking north to Bayard Street with Mulberry Bend on left, c. 1890

Mulberry Bend was an area surrounding a curve on Mulberry Street, in the Five Points neighborhood in Lower Manhattan, New York City. It is located in what is now Chinatown in Manhattan.

== Boundaries ==
It was bounded by Bayard Street to the north, Cross Street to the south (renamed Park Street in 1854), Orange Street to the west (renamed Baxter Street in 1854), and Mulberry Street to the east. The "Bend" in the street layout was due to the original topography of the area. Orange and Mulberry streets headed from southeast to northwest then turned north at the "Bend" to avoid Collect Pond and surrounding low-lying wetland to the west. The present-day Columbus Park occupies the Bend.

== Description ==
Mulberry Bend was considered one of the worst parts of the Five Points, with multiple back alleyways such as Bandit's Roost, Bottle Alley and Ragpickers Row. In 1897, due in part to the efforts of Danish photojournalist Jacob Riis, Mulberry Bend was demolished and turned into Mulberry Bend Park, an urban green space designed by Calvert Vaux. In 1911 it was renamed Columbus Park.

A few tenement buildings on the east side of Mulberry Street dating from the era before the park was built are still there, including 48-50 Mulberry Street, mentioned in Riis' book How the Other Half Lives.

Cross Street was renamed "Mosco Street" in 1982 after Lower East Side community activist Frank Mosco. The section of Cross Street between Mulberry and Baxter streets was demapped and added to Columbus Park along with the triangular plaza between Cross and Worth streets. Worth Street, originally laid out in 1859, has since become the southern boundary of Columbus Park.

The following is from Jacob Riis's How The Other Half Lives:

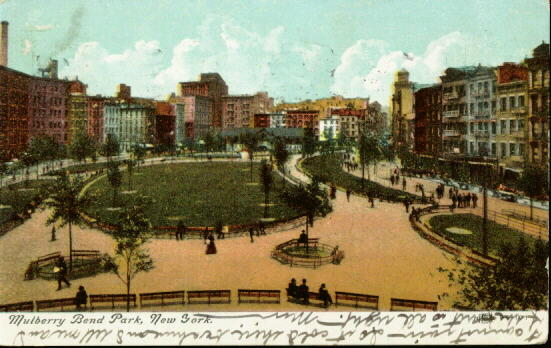
Mulberry Bend Park c. 1912, established in part due to the efforts of photojournalist Jacob Riis

Where Mulberry Street crooks like an elbow within hail of the old depravity of the Five Points, is "the Bend", foul core of New York’s slums. Long years ago the cows coming home from the pasture trod a path over this hill. Echoes of tinkling bells linger there still, but they do not call up memories of green meadows and summer fields; they proclaim the home-coming of the rag-picker’s cart. In the memory of man the old cow-path has never been other than a vast human pig-sty. There is but one "Bend" in the world, and it is enough. The city authorities, moved by the angry protests of ten years of sanitary reform effort, have decided that it is too much and must come down. Another Paradise Park will take its place and let in sunlight and air to work such transformation as at the Five Points, around the corner of the next block. Never was change more urgently needed. Around "the Bend" cluster the bulk of the tenements that are stamped as altogether bad, even by the optimists of the Health Department. Incessant raids cannot keep down the crowds that make them their home. In the scores of back alleys, of stable lanes and hidden byways, of which the rent collector alone can keep track, they share such shelter as the ramshackle structures afford with every kind of abomination rifled from the dumps and ash-barrels of the city. Here, too, shunning the light, skulks the unclean beast of dishonest idleness. "The Bend" is the home of the tramp as well as the rag-picker.

== Locations in the Bend ==
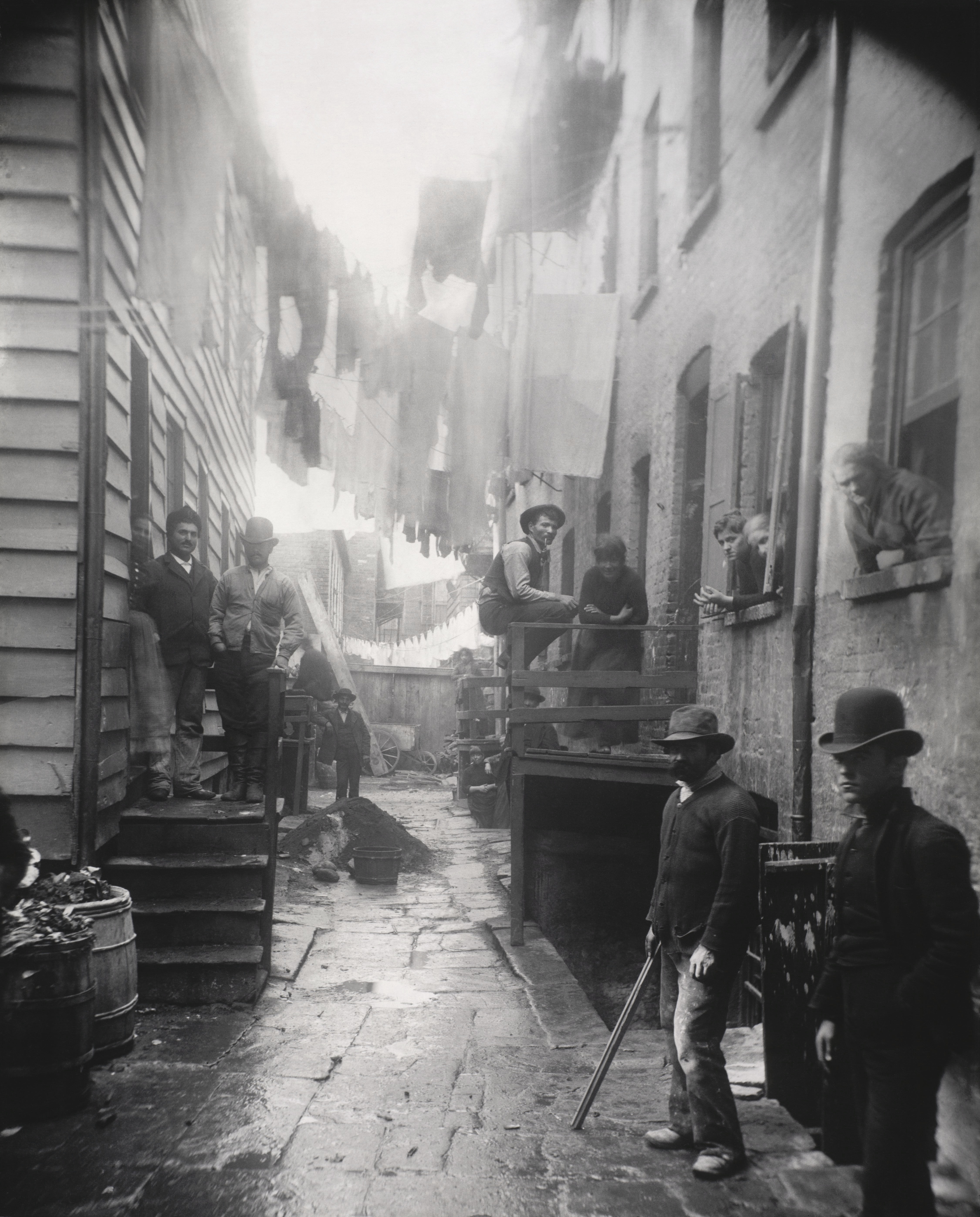
Bandits' Roost, 59 1/2 Mulberry Street, 1888 photograph by Jacob Riis

- 21 Baxter Street: The Baxter Street Dudes were a New York teenage street gang, mostly of former newsboys and bootblacks, who ran a makeshift theater with stolen and salvaged equipment, props and costumes in the basement of a dive bar at 21 Baxter Street during the 1870s. They called their enterprise the Grand Duke's Theatre, where they wrote and performed plays, musicals and variety shows which were enjoyed by other street toughs and slummers throughout the city. They were eventually closed down for failure to pay the "amusement tax" levied by the city.
- 59 1/2 Mulberry Street: The location of the alleyway known as "Bandit's Roost" immortalized in a photograph by Jacob Riis.
- 67 Orange Street: Almack's Dance Hall located at 67 Orange Street, owned by African American Pete Williams. It was at Almack's, also known as Pete Williams's Place, that Master Juba, a young African-American dancer, performed in the early 1840s. Juba was influential in the development of such American dance styles as tap and step dancing. In 1842 English author Charles Dickens visited Almack's on his tour of the Five Points. Watching Juba dance was the only redeeming aspect he found to Five Points.
