= Columbus Park (Manhattan) =

Public park in Manhattan, New York

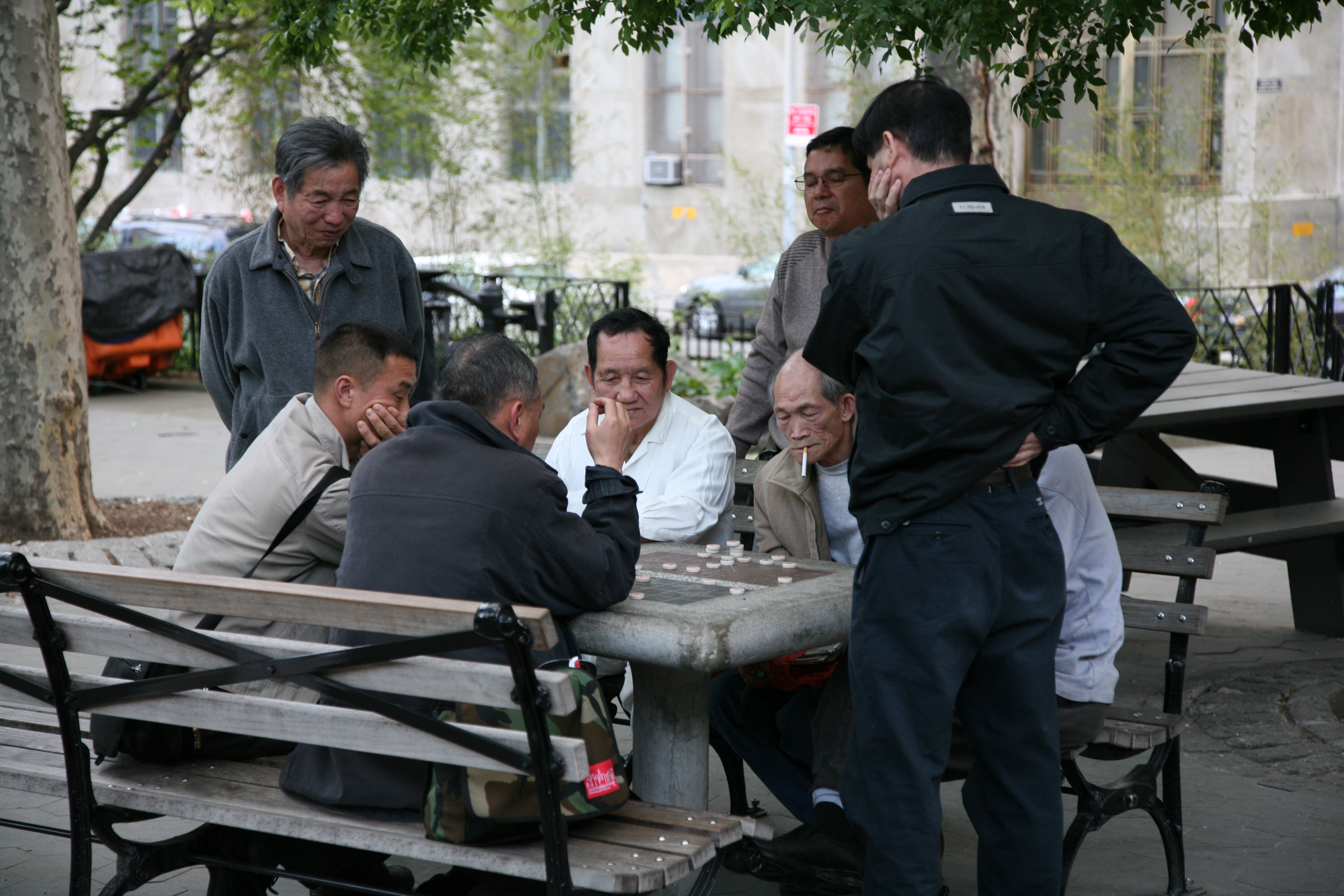
- Xiangqi (Chinese chess) players and onlookers in the park in 2008
- Interactive map of Columbus Park
- Location: Chinatown, Manhattan
- Nearest city: New York City, United States
- Coordinates: 40°42′53.5″N 73°59′59.5″W
- Operator: New York City Department of Parks and Recreation

Columbus Park formerly known as Mulberry Bend Park, Five Points Park and Paradise Park, is a public park in Chinatown, Manhattan, in New York City that was built in 1897.

American photojournalist Jacob Riis (best known for How The Other Half Lives) is generally credited with "transforming Mulberry Bend from a 'notorious slum' to a park" in order to improve tenement dwellers' quality of life in the neighborhood.

== History ==
=== Early history ===
Until 1808, the site of Columbus Park was part of a swampy area adjacent to the Collect Pond (also known as Fresh Water Pond), located in what is now Foley Square. The marshy land hosted tanneries that used the pond for leather processing. When the Collect Pond was filled in 1808 to create Pearl Street, the landfill began to sink over time, releasing foul odors from decomposing organic matter. This environmental degradation severely depressed property values and living conditions, transforming the area into an undesirable location that attracted the city's poorest residents and ultimately became the notorious Five Points slum.

=== Prior slum ===
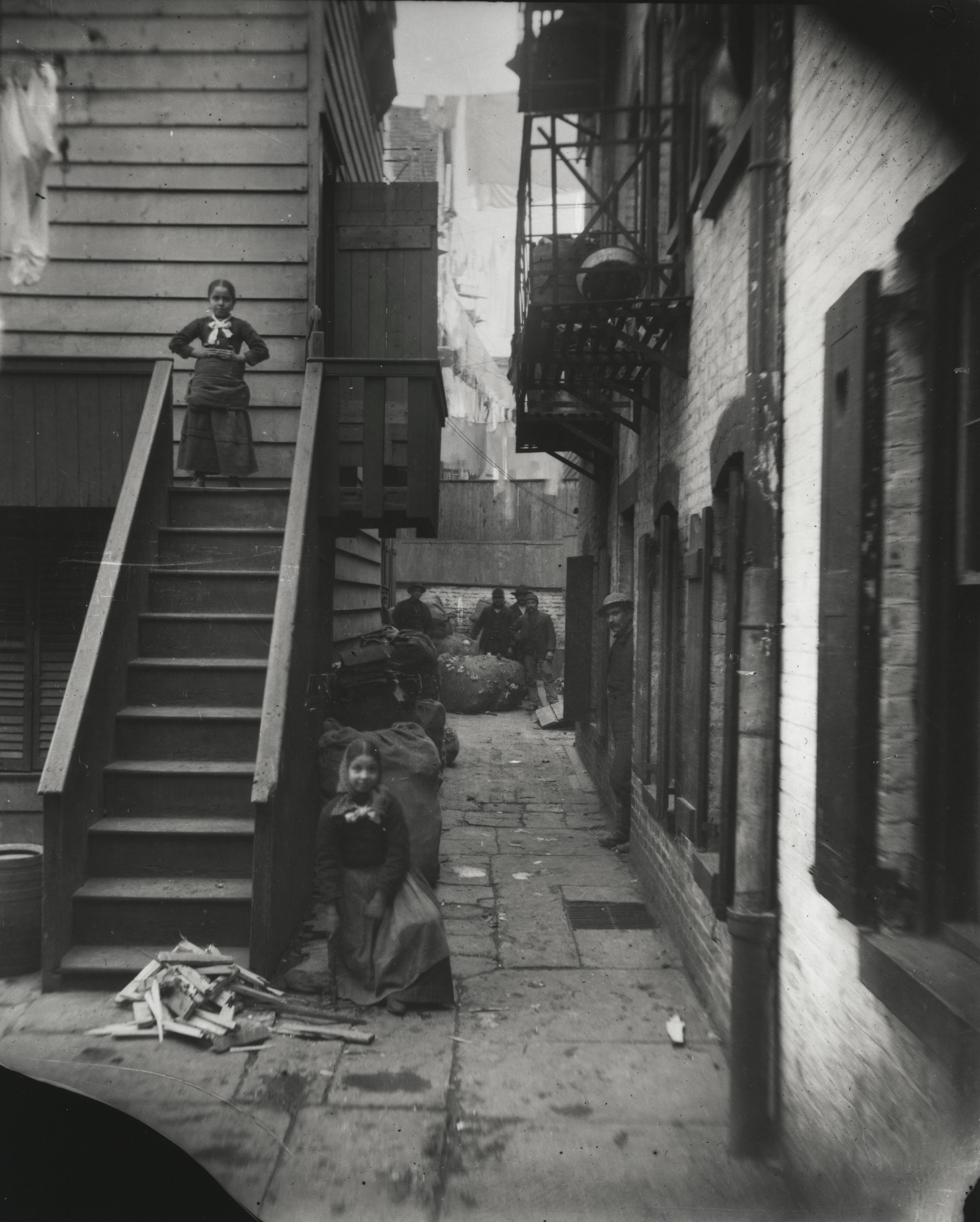
Baxter Street in Mulberry Bend c. 1890, now destroyed; photographed by Riis

During the 19th century, Mulberry Bend (a curve of Mulberry Street) was the center of the Five Points neighborhood, the most dangerous ghetto area of immigrant New York.

Before the park's establishment, Mulberry Bend was an alley Riis considered the "foul core of New York’s slums." The Bend is the site of Riis's 1888 photograph, Bandits' Roost, 59 1/2 Mulberry Street.

Photographer and social activist Jacob A. Riis, "friend of the tenement house children," campaigned for the creation of the park.

=== 1897 establishment ===
In 1897, due in part to Riis's advocacy, Mulberry Bend was demolished, tearing down "several blocks" of what the American Park and Outdoor Art Association called "the worst tenement-houses in the world."

William Dean, captain of Manhattan's Sixth Precinct, stated in 1897,

The establishment of Mulberry Bend Park is one of the greatest blessings that could be bestowed on the people of this precinct, as it eradicated one of the worst blocks in the city, which was made the home of a horde of the most depraved and debased classes, male and female, of all nationalities. Since the eradication of this block, the whole neighborhood has taken a change, and decidedly for the better.

The same year, Riis praised the park's positive effects on the impoverished children and the neighborhood crime rate:

The troublesome boys had not moved away. They had found something better to do than smashing lamps and windows and getting themselves arrested. They had a place now to romp in. That was all they wanted...In healthy play, youthful energies find a safe outlet.

=== 20th century ===
A postcard claims it was widened circa 1905.

In 1911, Frederick Law Olmsted and Calvert Vaux completed a redesign of the park, which was then renamed Columbus Park.

From 1934 until 1971, a statue of Columbus by Emma Stebbins, better known for creating the bronze statue of the Angel of the Waters at the center of Central Park’s Bethesda Fountain, stood in the Park. Additionally, in 1934 the park underwent construction starting August to add more trees and expand the playground, and on Columbus Day the park’s reopening drew an estimated 15,000 attendees and the Bronx Homing Pigeon Club released 442 homing pigeons for each year that passed since 1492.

Beginning in 1936, Columbus Park became the site of the annual Chinatown Community Play Day. The celebration was organized by neighborhood groups and civic leaders and it featured baseball, handball, foot races, and performances by Chinese Boy Scout Troop 150. There was also a baby contest, where infants competed in categories like healthiest, friendliest, best dressed, and strongest lungs.

In 1970, the Chinese American Arts Council (unit of the Chinese-American Planning Council) launched the Chinatown Outdoor Summer Festival in the park to celebrate Chinese arts and cultural identity. By the festival’s tenth anniversary in 1980, the free event featured a range of performances from traditional Chinese opera to folk dance and modern pop music.

=== 21st century ===
As of 2013, the park often serves as a gathering place for the local Chinese community, where "the neighborhood meets up here to play mahjong, perform traditional Chinese music... [and] practice tai chi in the early mornings."

In 2019, a statue of Dr. Sun Yat-sen by Lu Chun-Hsiung and Michael Kang was permanently installed in the northern plaza of the park. The plaza was also renamed for the founder of the first Republic of China, who lived in Manhattan's Chinatown for a time.

In October 2021, a large-scale crochet mural made of over 1,500 flowers was put up on the fences of Columbus Park by Chinatown Yarn Circle and Think!Chinatown. The project and its flowers are "in tribute to AAPI community builders, embodying collaboration, triumph over struggle and inspiring future generations."

== Gallery ==
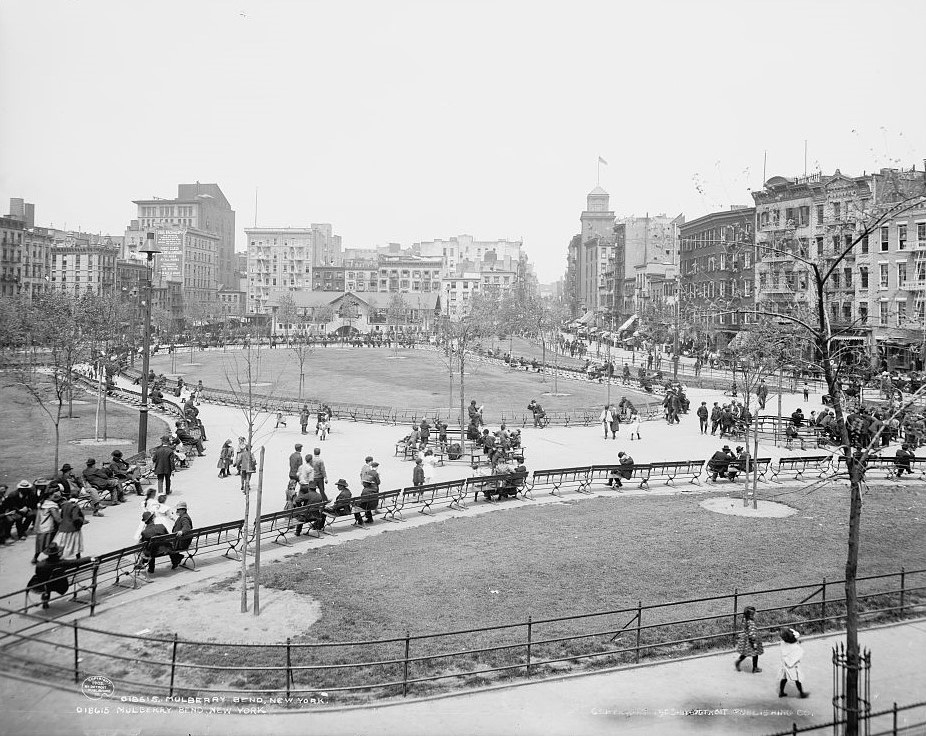
Mulberry Bend Park, c. 1905

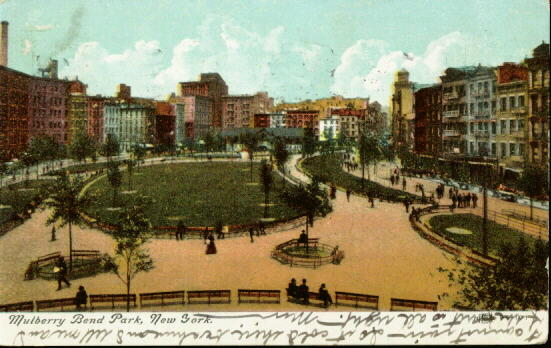
Mulberry Bend Park c. 1912

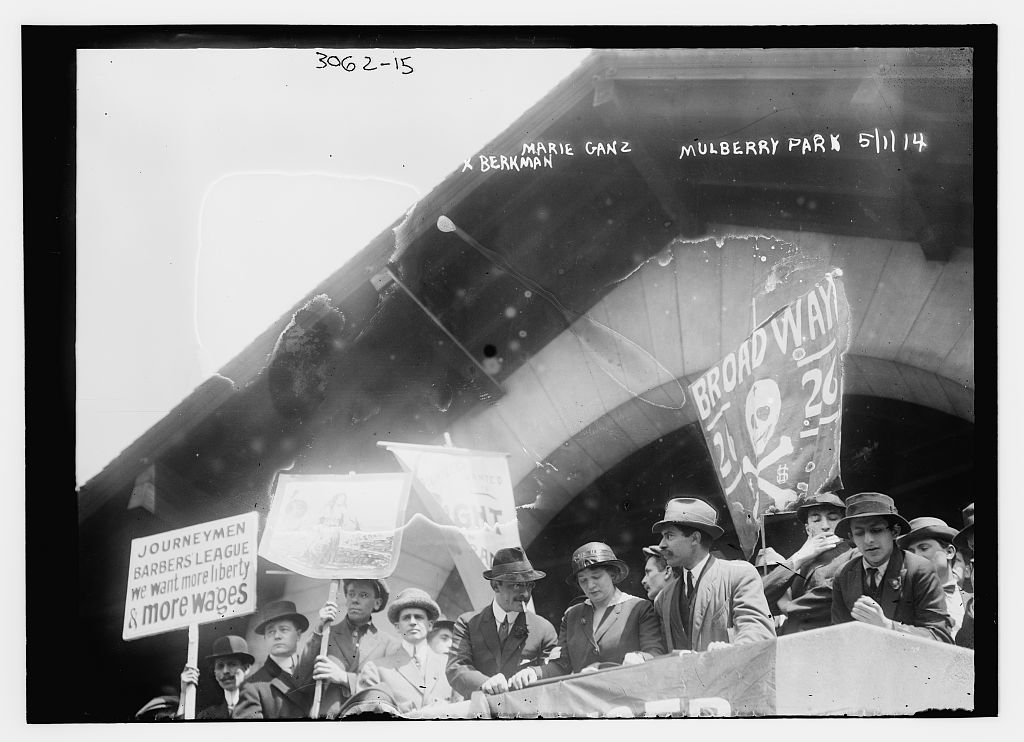
Anarchists Alexander Berkman and Marie Ganz rally for workers in Mulberry Bend Park during the Colorado Coalfield War, 1914

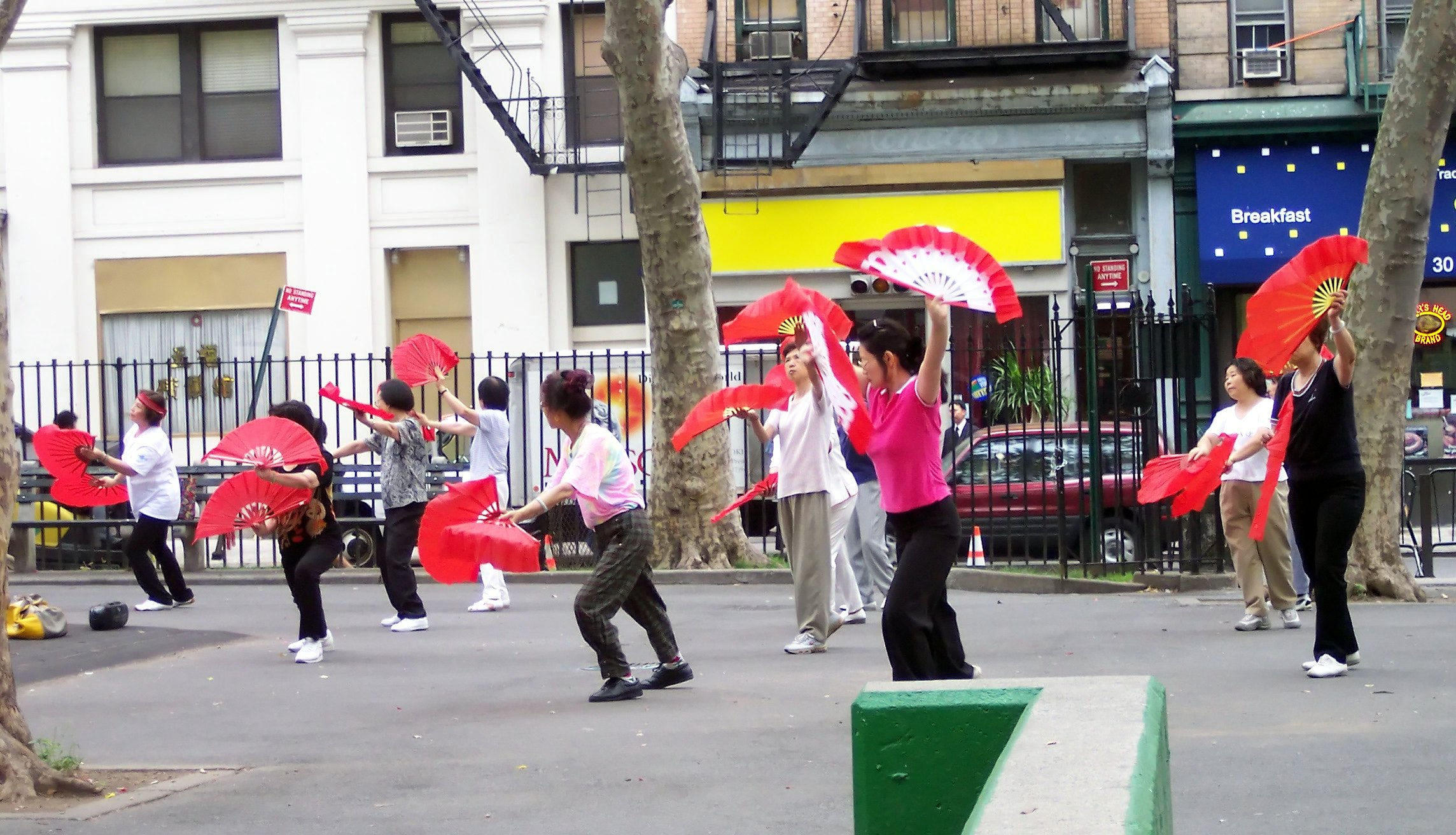
Chinese Americans practicing tai chi in the park, 2005

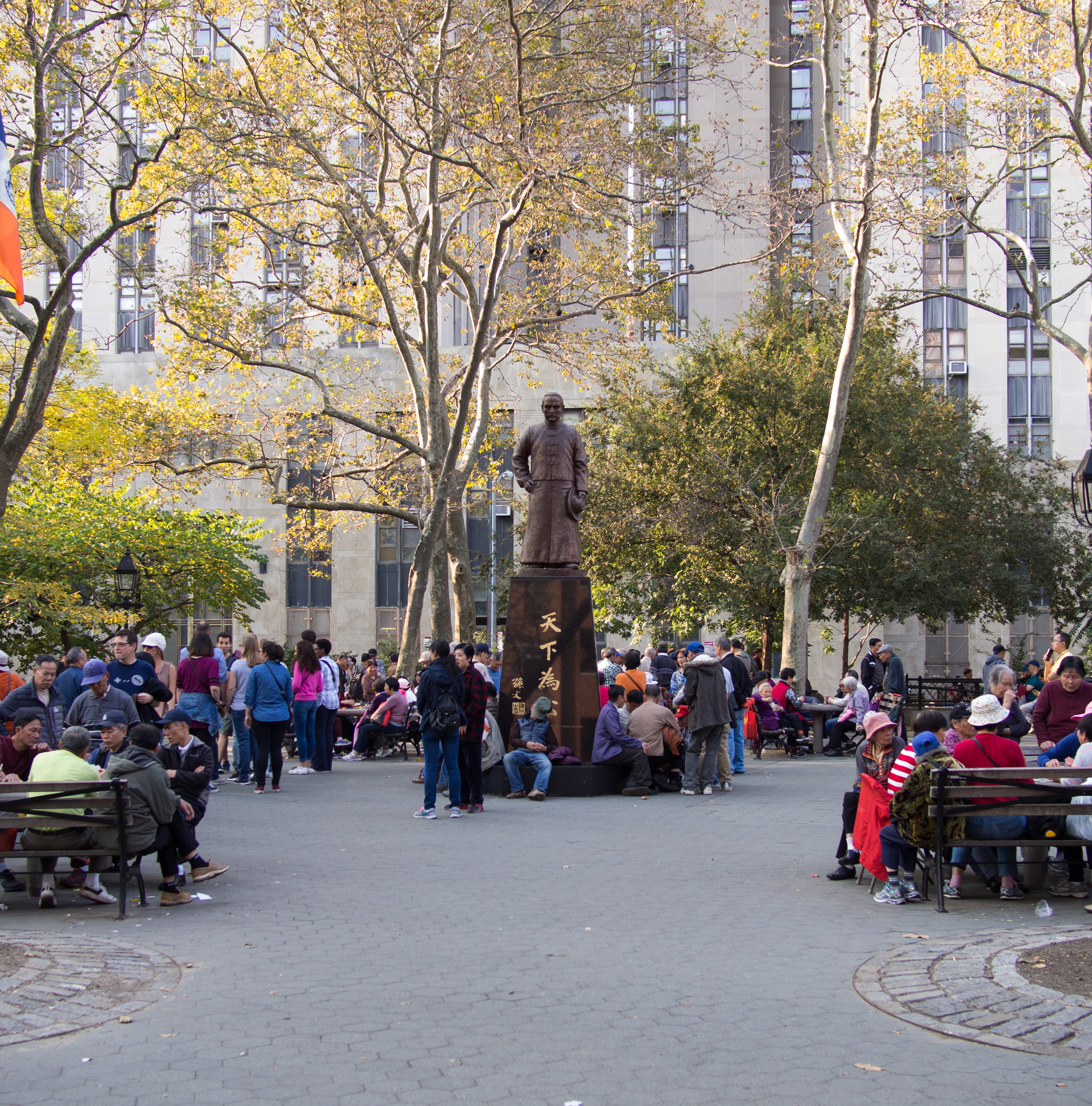
Statue of Chinese statesman Dr. Sun Yat-sen in Columbus Park, 2016

== See also ==
- 1982 garment workers' strike
- Chinese Americans in New York City
