= Mulberry Street (Manhattan) =

Street in Manhattan, New York

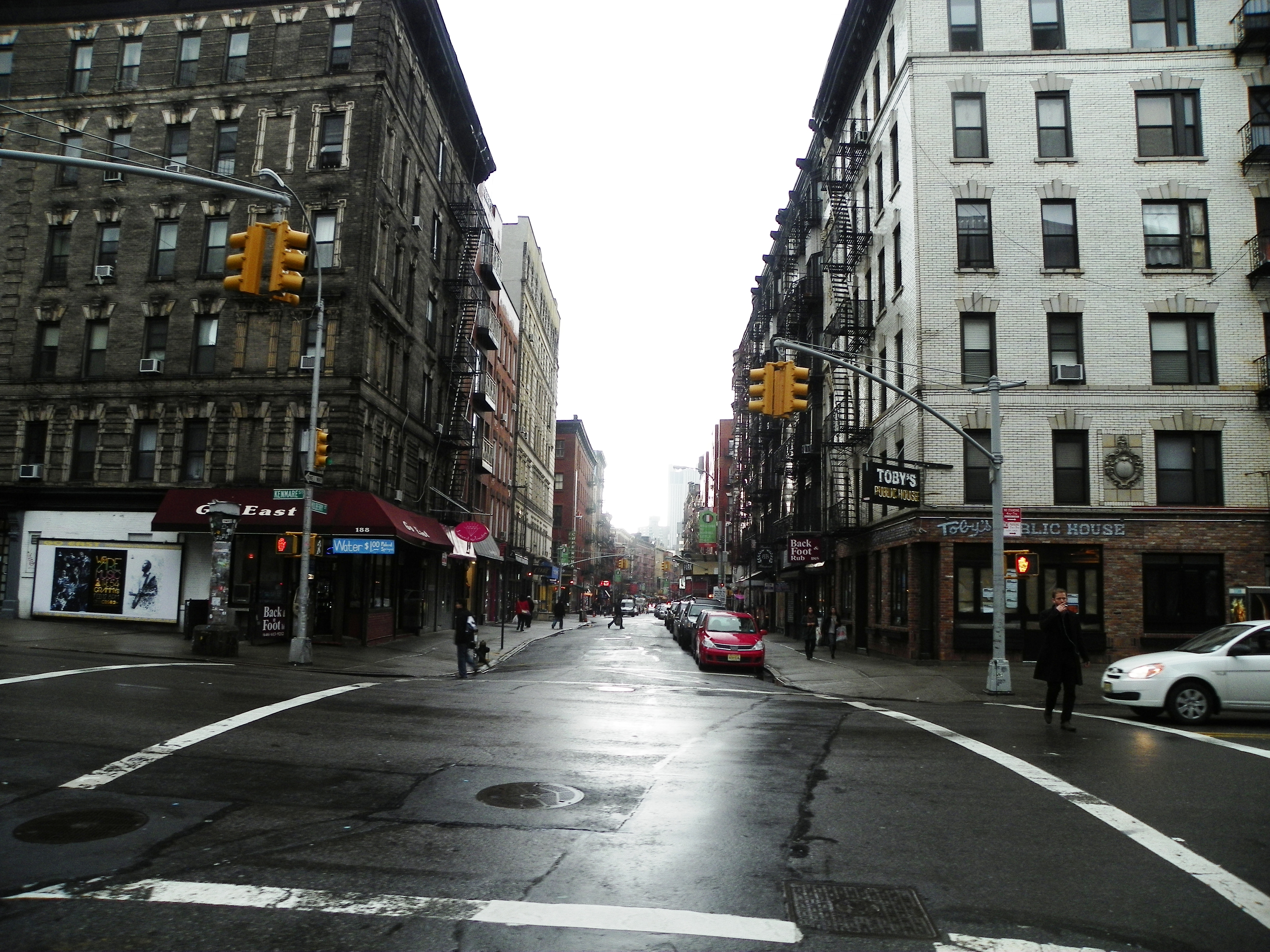
- Mulberry Street in 2012
- Interactive map of Mulberry Street
- Former names: Catherine Street, Slaughter-House Street
- Namesake: Mulberry trees
- Maintained by: NYCDOT
- Length: 0.8 mi (1.3 km)
- Location: Chinatown; Little Italy; Nolita; NoHo, Manhattan, New York City
- Postal code: 10012, 10013
- Coordinates: 40.7191°N 73.9974°W
- South end: Worth Street
- Major junctions: Mosco Street; Bayard Street; Canal Street; Hester Street; Grand Street; Broome Street; Kenmare Street; Spring Street; Prince Street; Jersey Street; East Houston Street
- North end: Bleecker Street

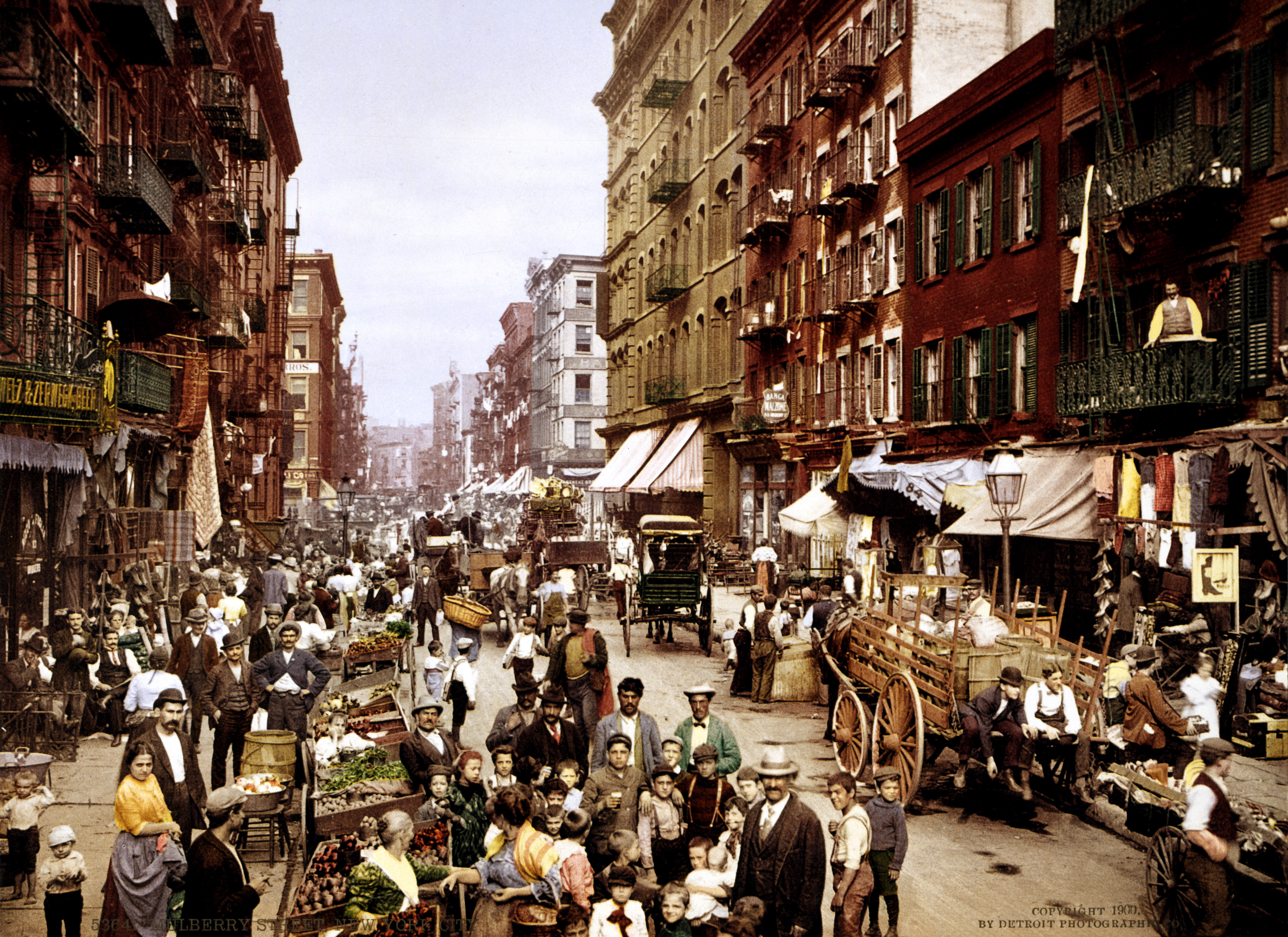
Mulberry Street, c. 1900

Mulberry Street is a north–south street in Lower Manhattan, New York City, United States. It is commonly associated with Italian-American culture and heritage, and has long been the heart of Manhattan's Little Italy.

The street was listed on maps of the area since at least 1755. The "Bend" in Mulberry, where the street changes direction from southeast to northwest to a northerly direction, was made to avoid the wetlands surrounding the Collect Pond. During the period of the American Revolution, Mulberry Street was usually referred to as "Slaughter-house Street", named for the slaughterhouse of Nicholas Bayard on what is now the southwest corner of Mulberry and Bayard Streets, which was located there until the summer of 1784, when it was ordered to be removed to Corlaer's Hook.

Mulberry Bend, formed by Mulberry Street on the east and Orange Street on the west, was historically part of the core of the infamous Five Points; the southwest corner of Mulberry Bend formed part of the Five Points intersection for which the neighborhood was named. Aside from Mulberry, the other four streets forming Five Points were Anthony Street (now Worth Street), Cross Street (now Mosco Street), Orange Street (now Baxter Street), and Little Water Street (which no longer exists).

== Location ==
Mulberry is located between Baxter and Mott Streets. It runs north to south, through the centers of Little Australia and Little Italy, parallel to Mott Street one block to the east, is bound on the north by Bleecker Street in NoHo and on the south by Worth Street in the Civic Center. On the Italian section of Mulberry Street, it is lined with Italian restaurants, gelaterias, bakeries, and delis. Near the southern portion of Mulberry Street, the street enters Chinatown.

Further south past Bayard Street, on the west side of the street, lies Columbus Park, which was created in 1897. The southwest corner of the park (away from Mulberry Street) is the site of the original Five Points intersection. The east side of the street is now lined with Chinatown's funeral homes.

=== Mulberry Bend ===
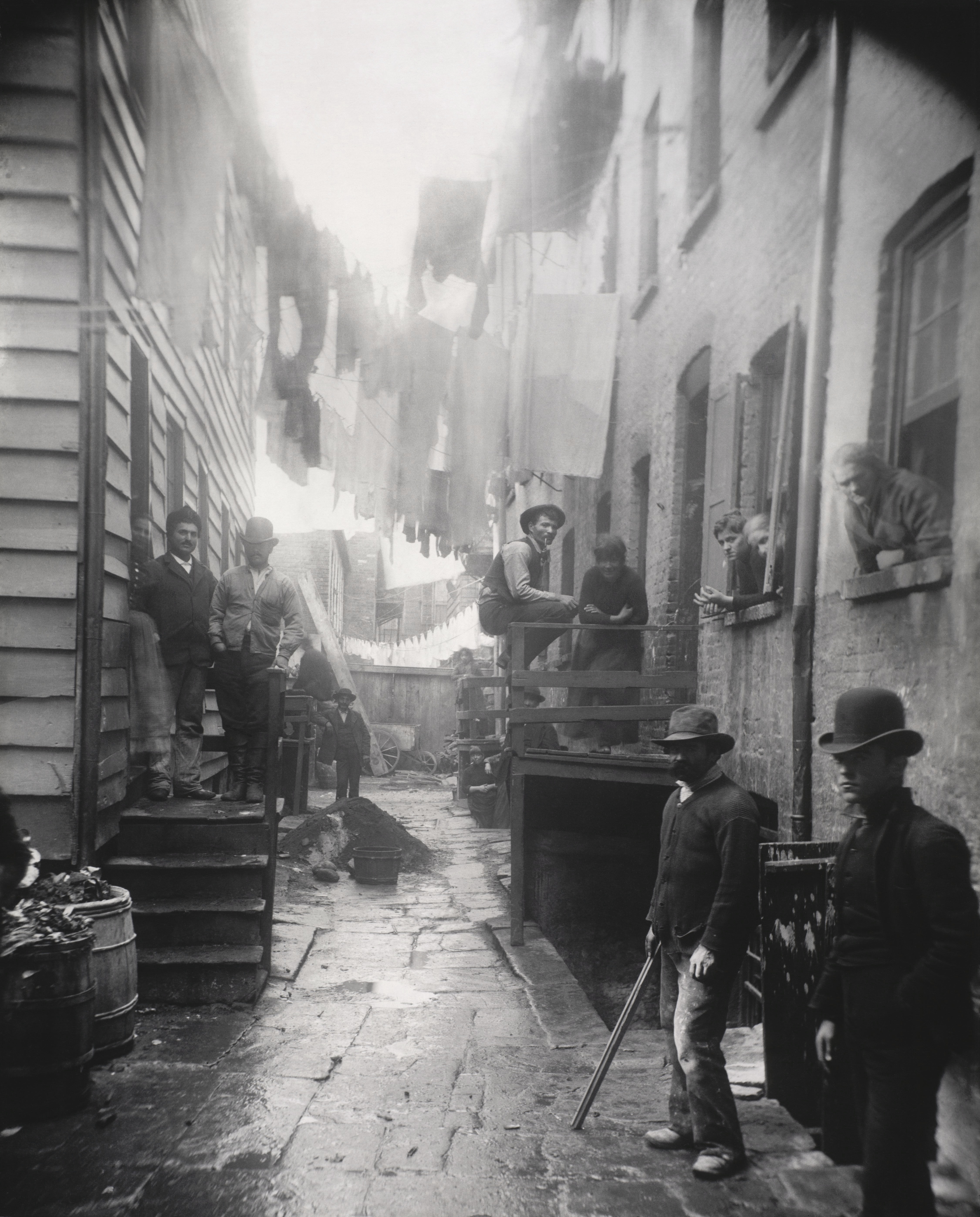
"Bandit's Roost", a Mulberry Street back alley, photographed by Jacob Riis in 1888, a target of police efforts in the 1880s and 1890s

The street was named after the mulberry trees that once lined Mulberry Bend, the slight bend in Mulberry Street. "Mulberry Bend is a narrow bend in Mulberry Street, a tortuous ravine of tall tenement-houses ... so full of people that the throngs going and coming spread off the sidewalk nearly to the middle of the street ... The crowds are in the street because much of the sidewalk and all of the gutter is taken up with vendors' stands."

For the urban reformer Jacob Riis, Mulberry Bend epitomized the worst of the city's slums: "A Mulberry Bend Alley" contrasted with "Mulberry Bend becomes a park" were two of the photographs illustrating Jacob Riis's call for renewal in The Battle with the Slum (1902). In response to reformers such as Riis, the city in the 1890s bought out many of the slumlords and replaced tenements with Columbus Park.

=== Notable buildings ===
The Puck Building stands near the north end of the street on the southwest corner of Houston Street. Further south is Saint Patrick's Old Cathedral, standing in its churchyard. The Church of the Most Precious Blood, at 113 Baxter Street, was built by Italians, who as new immigrants were not allowed to worship in the main Churches of Transfiguration nor St. Patrick's Old Cathedral. Below Prince Street (no. 247) is the former Ravenite Social Club, where wire taps acquired evidence that sent John Gotti to prison.

The Italian American Museum is at 155 Mulberry and Grand Street in the building that used to house the Italian immigrant bank Banca Stabile.

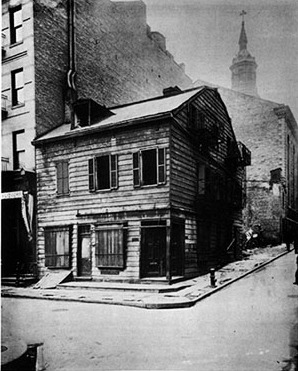
Black Horse Tavern Mulberry And Park St.

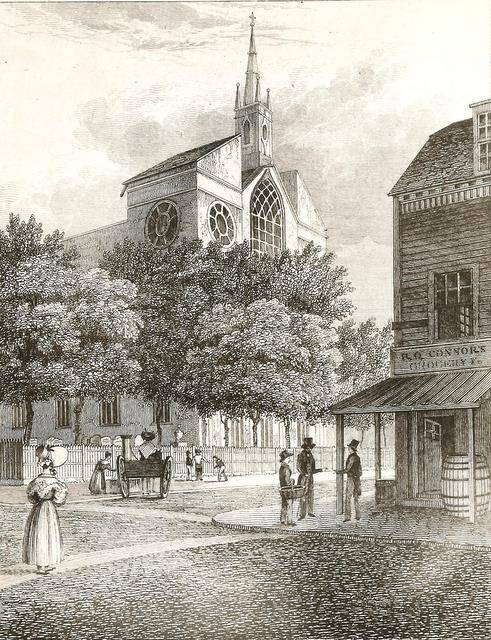
Saint Patrick's Old Cathedral (1815)

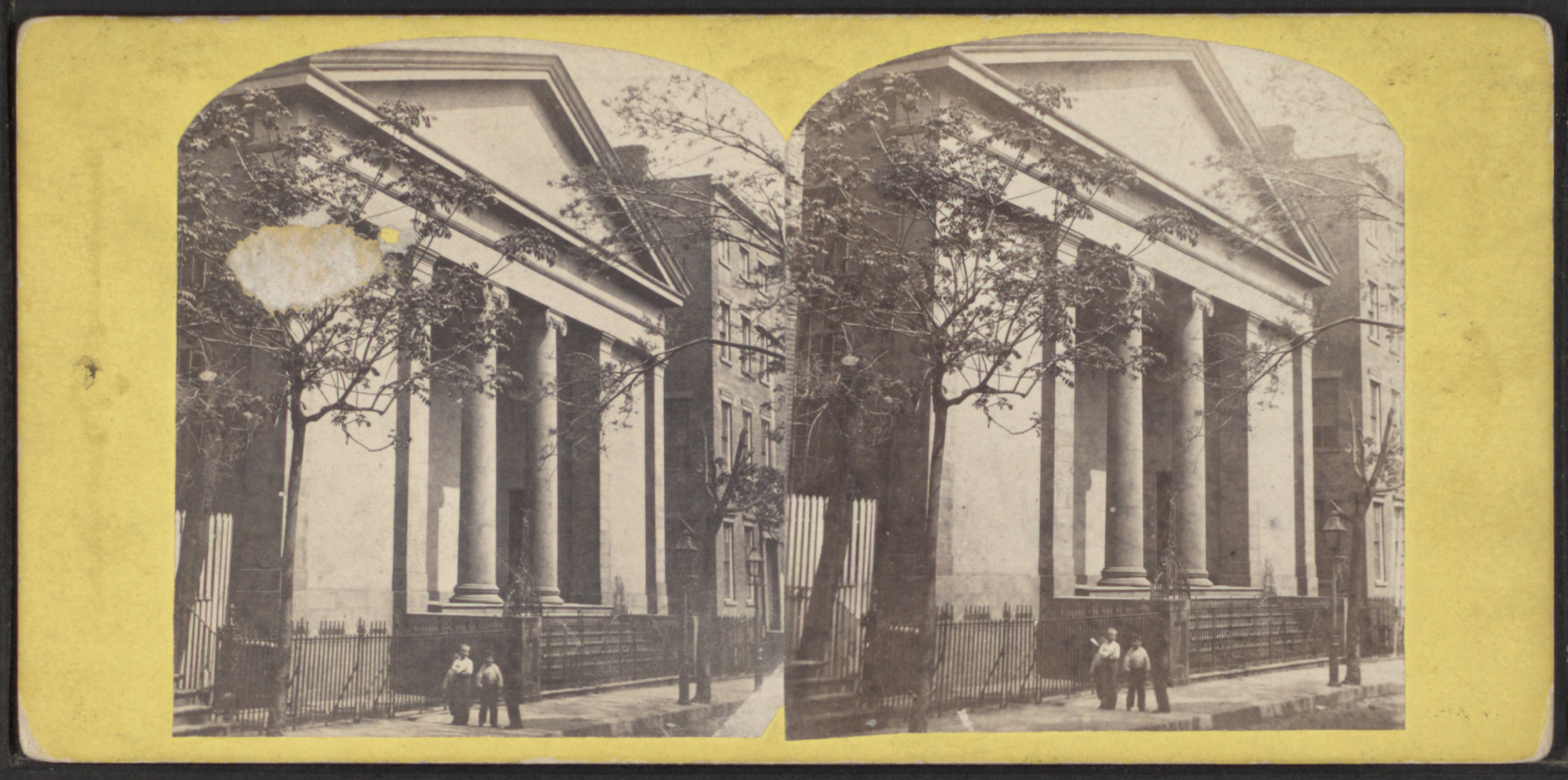
St. Philip's Church, Mulberry St.

== Culture ==
=== Social structure ===
The New York Times sent its reporters to characterize the Little Italy/Mulberry neighborhood in May 1896:

They are laborers; toilers in all grades of manual work; they are artisans, they are junkman, and here, too, dwell the rag pickers....There is a monster colony of Italians who might be termed the commercial or shop keeping community of the Latins. Here are all sorts of stores, pensions, groceries, fruit emporiums, tailors, shoemakers, wine merchants, importers, musical instrument makers....There are notaries, lawyers, doctors, apothecaries, undertakers.... There are more bankers among the Italians than among any other foreigners except the Germans in the city.

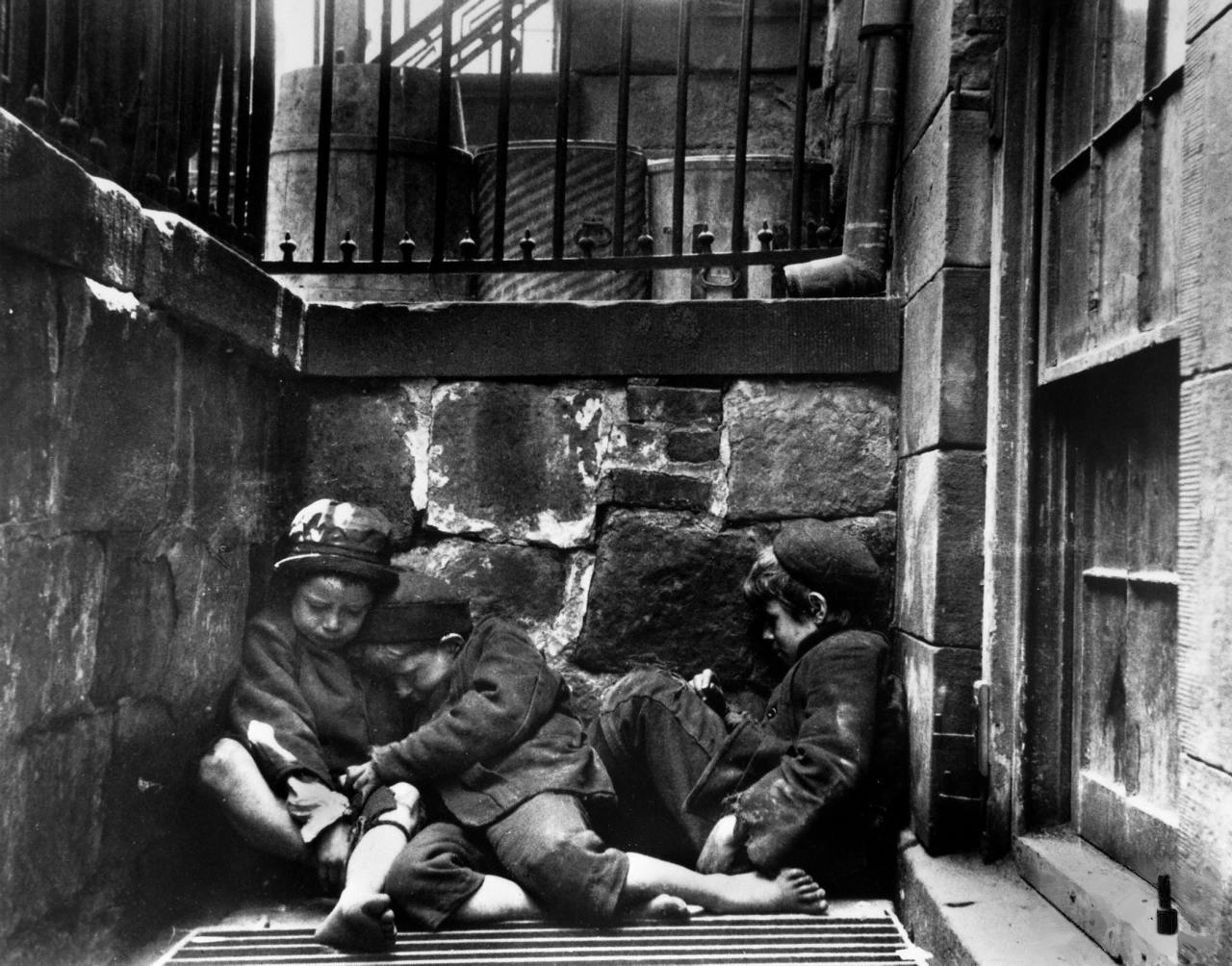
Children sleeping in Mulberry Street (1890)

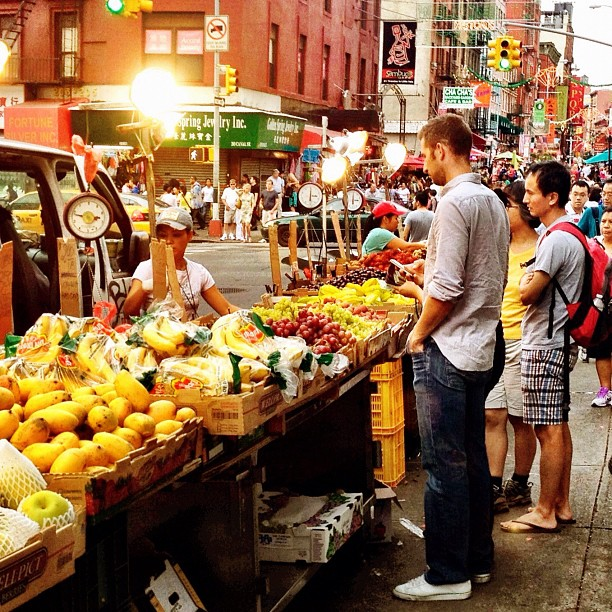
Produce stand on Mulberry Street

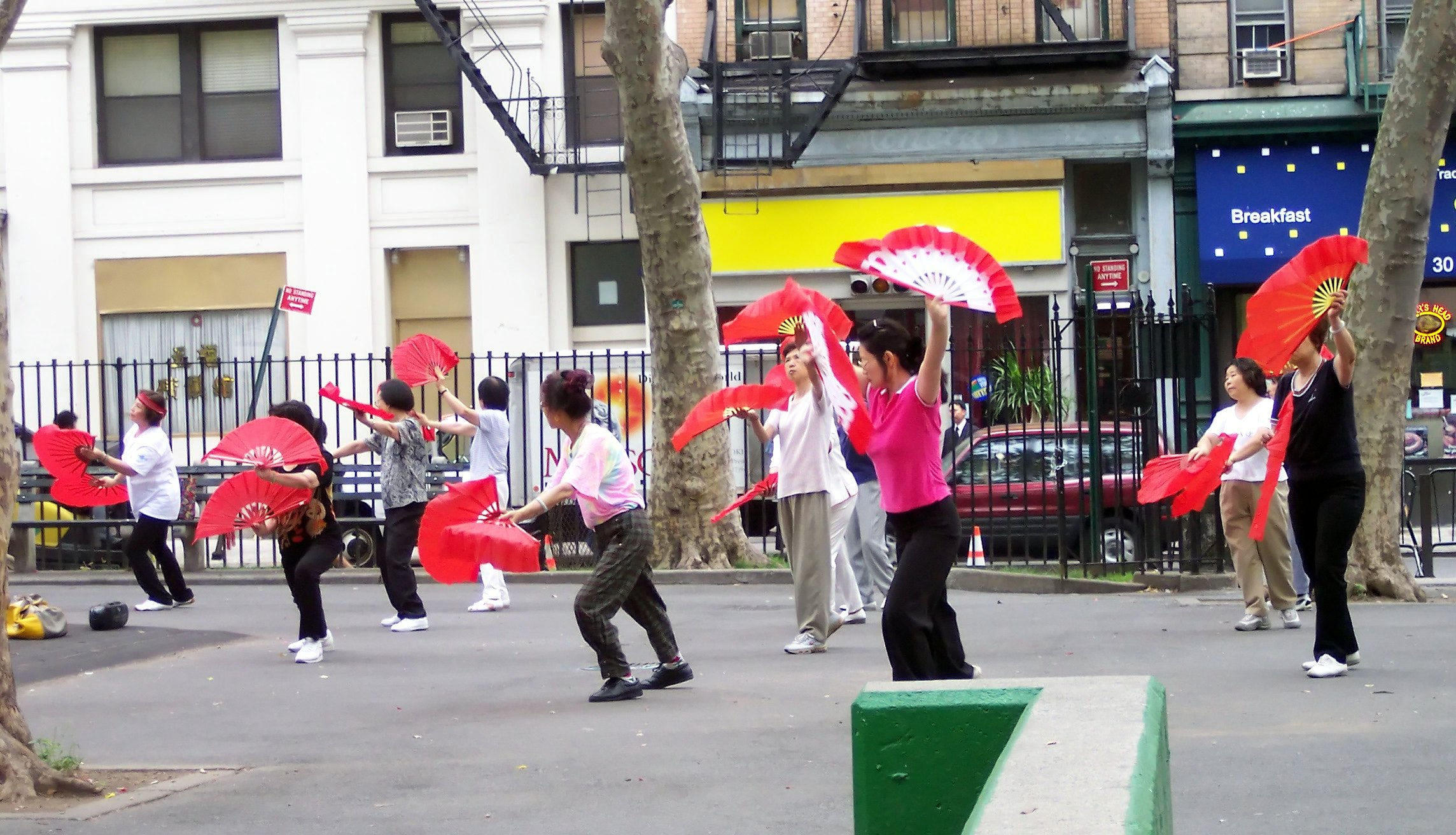
Tai Chi practiced on Mulberry Street

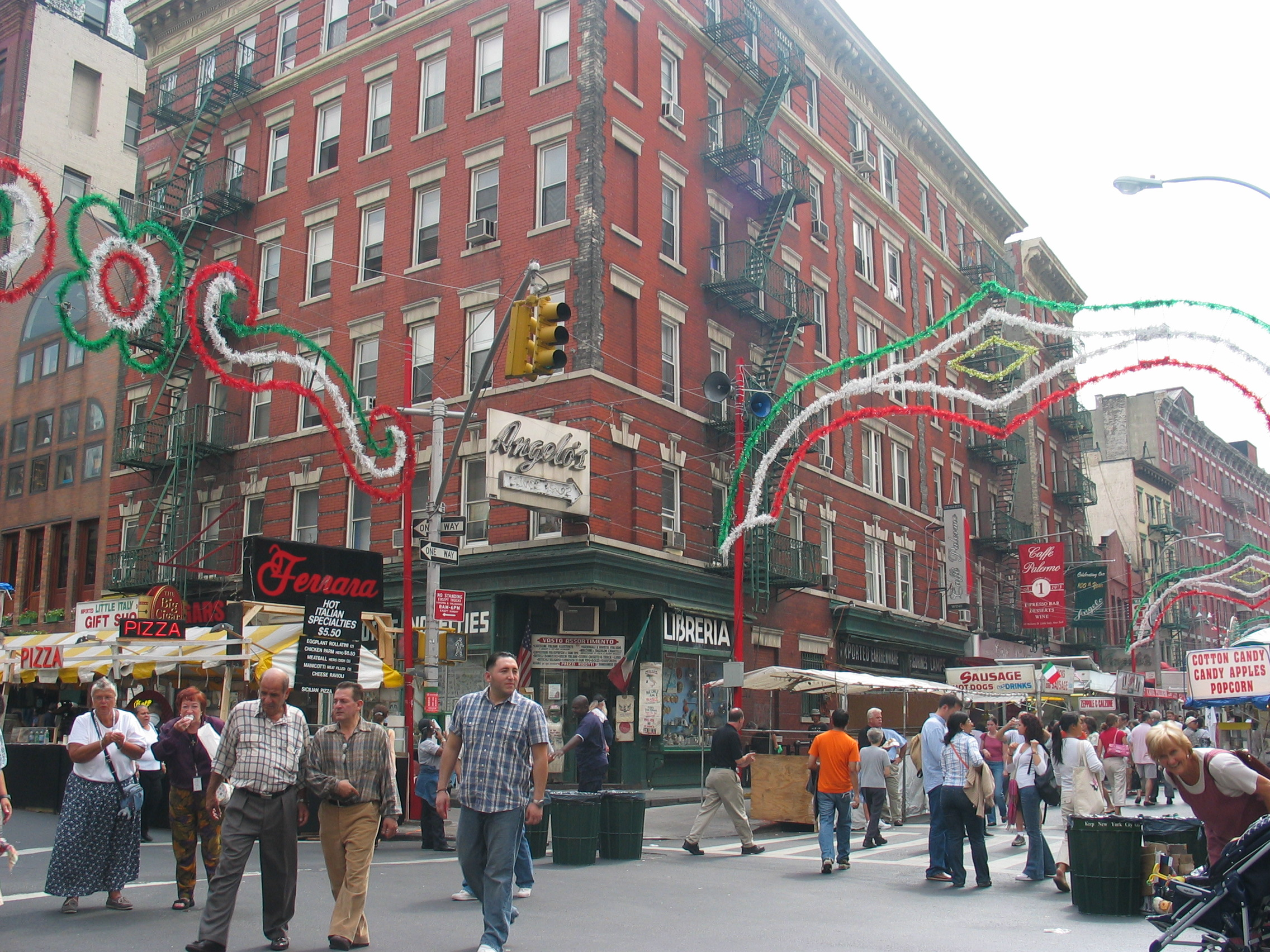
Feast in Little Italy on Mulberry

=== Feast of San Gennaro ===
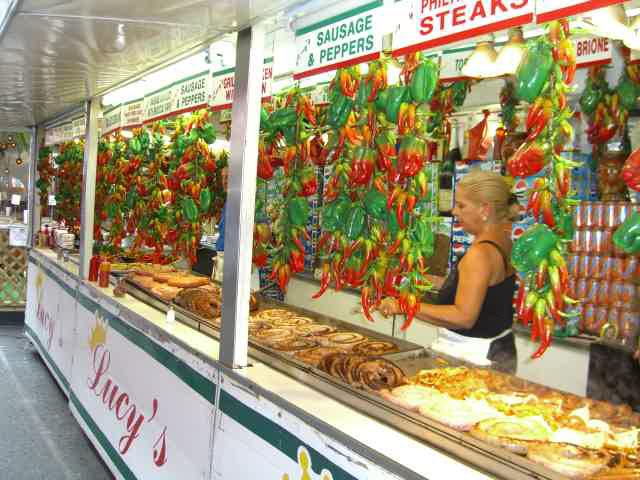
Festival of the Feast of San Gennaro on Mulberry Street in 2006

During the Italian-American festival of the Feast of San Gennaro each September, the entire street is blocked off to vehicular traffic for the street fair. The San Gennaro Feast has been held since 1926. It is the largest Italian-American Festival in New York and possibly the United States.

== In popular culture ==
Manhattan's Mulberry Street has been the subject of books, films, and music. For example:

Books

- The King of Mulberry Street, by Donna Jo Napoli. A young boy in the 1890s travels alone from Napoli (Naples), Italy to New York, where he settles on Mulberry Street.
- Billy Joel's song "Big Man on Mulberry Street" is a jazz-influenced song from his album The Bridge (1986).
- Twenty One Pilots' "Mulberry Street" from their album Scaled and Icy.

Film

- Mulberry St. is a 2010 documentary film by American filmmaker Abel Ferrara.

== See also ==
- Little Australia
