= Chinese Staff and Workers' Association =

US nonprofit organization

Chinese Staff and Worker's Association
- Formation: 1979
- Type: Non-profit NGO
- Headquarters: New York, New York
- Region served: United States
- Members: 1,300 workers in various trades
- Official language: English and Chinese
- Executive Director: Wing Lam

The Chinese Staff and Worker's Association (CSWA) (traditional Chinese: 華人職工會; simplified Chinese: 华人职工会; pinyin: Huárén Zhí Gōnghuì; Jyutping: Waa4jan4 Zik1 Gung1wui6) is a nonprofit, nonpartisan workers' rights organization based in New York City which educates and organizes workers in the United States so that they may improve their working conditions. It primarily assists workers in restaurants, the garment and construction industries, although it is active among workers in a variety of professions. The organization serves workers from all backgrounds, most of its members are Chinese and most of its efforts directed at employers in Chinatown.

CSWA's Chinese name transliterates as "workers' social club."

CSWA is a worker center, not a labor union. It has often been described as a "pre-union" organization—an organization outside established organized labor but which can or should, over time, become a labor union. However, others point out that CSWA and other worker centers are more appropriately designated "post-union" organizations. CSWA leaders forcefully distinguish their organization from traditional labor unions. CSWA often criticizes labor unions for not advocating effectively on behalf of workers, and has negotiated with or sued labor unions for failing to fairly represent their members.

CSWA has a membership of about 600 workers, although active supporters and volunteers number in the several hundreds. In addition to its headquarters, the organization has centers in Brooklyn and Flushing. CSWA's executive director is its founder, Wing Lam.

== Goals and activities ==
CSWA engages in educational efforts, assists workers in enforcing their legal rights and helps workers become more effective advocates in the workplace.

CSWA's primary function is to help workers, most of whom are immigrants with a poor grasp of spoken and/or written English, understand their rights as workers under local, state and federal law. CSWA also assists workers by filing lawsuits against employers, either on its own or in cooperation with the Asian American Legal Defense and Education Fund or attorneys working pro bono. CSWA also sponsors English-language classes, day-care, seminars on successful squatting and employment fairs which help workers become better employees and which enhance their employment prospects.

=== Legal activities ===
CSWA's legal efforts have achieved several significant victories.

In 1993, the group sued the Silver Palace restaurant in New York City's Chinatown on behalf of 17 waiters and busboys, alleging that the restaurant confiscated a portion of each workers' tips. During the legal battle, the employer locked out the workers for seven months. In the ensuing legal battle, CSWA attorneys discovered that the owners kept two sets of books, and the New York State Attorney General also sued on the workers' behalf. In 1996, the National Labor Relations Board awarded the workers $1.1 million in back pay. The restaurant declared bankruptcy and re-opened under new management. In 2003, a federal court ruled that the workers could continue their suit against the new owners. A partial settlement in the amount of $489,000 was reached later that year, and the lawsuit continued against those who had defaulted on their portion of the judgment.

A second significant case involved the Jing Fong restaurant. In 1997, CSWA convinced the New York State Attorney General to sue the restaurant for confiscating portions of the daily tips and wages of almost 60 workers. In 2000, a state court awarded the workers a $1.1 million judgment.

=== Legislative and policy-making activities ===
CSWA also mobilizes its members and immigrant workers in favor of legislation and government policies which improve the lives of its members and those it claims to represent.

In 1999, CSWA sued the New York State Department of Labor, alleging that the closure of unemployment insurance offices in and near Chinatown violated the Civil Rights Act of 1964. CSWA and the state settled in 2006, with the state agreeing to keep two offices open until a Chinese-language phone system was operational.

In June 2002, CSWA sponsored a rally at which nearly 2,000 Chinese and Hispanic immigrants demanded that the Federal Emergency Management Agency (FEMA) provide medical coverage for residents in Chinatown and the Lower East Side in the wake of respiratory and other diseases caused by airborne particles released by the collapse of World Trade Center buildings during the September 11, 2001 attacks.

In 2004, the organization successfully lobbied for the introduction and passage of the "Unpaid Wages Prohibition Act" in New York state.

CSWA has also been active in politics. It successfully protested the gentrification of Chinatown, which would have displaced many of the low-income residents the organization represents. A number of candidates for New York City Council have come out of the ranks of CSWA staff and supporters, although none have been elected, but in 2021, ((Christopher Marte)) won in a landslide victory over the candidates who had ties to the real estate and neoliberal special interests, such as Margaret Chin' backed Gigi Li and the Chinese-American Planning Council' candidate, Jenny Lam Low. However, the group did win a reorganization of city council districts, enhancing the voting strength of the residents of Chinatown. CSWA has also been active in the New York state legislature

=== Backlash ===
The work of the Chinese Staff and Worker's Association has occasionally drawn a violent response. In 1982, a suspicious fire burned down the organization's first office. One report states that men armed with clubs stormed the group's offices and made death-threats against the staff in 1997, and a second attempt was made to burn group's second headquarters down in 2000. Another says that in 1997, days after the New York State Attorney General announced a $1.5 million lawsuit against the Jing Fong restaurant, CSWA's Manhattan office was fire bombed. A third report has it that a bomb was detonated outside CSWA headquarters in 2000 after the group won its legal suit against the Jing Fong restaurant.

== Founding ==
Wing Lam is a Chinese immigrant who was a member of, and later a staff organizer for, the Union of Needletrades, Industrial and Textile Employees (UNITE). However, his experiences with the union proved negative, and he left its employment in 1978.

That same year, Lam assisted Chinese workers at the Silver Palace, New York Chinatown's largest restaurant, in forming a union with the Hotel Employees and Restaurant Employees Union (HERE). The workers struck and won a contract—the first union contract for workers at a Chinese restaurant in New York City. Unhappy with HERE, however, the workers disaffiliated in 1980 and formed the Chinese Staff and Workers' Association. The former HERE affiliate, Local 318 Restaurant Workers Union, became part of CSWA.

CSWA soon organized unions at other restaurants.

CSWA has since expanded its outreach to workers in a variety of industries. It has been most active in the garment industry, where working conditions are harsh and non-payment and under-payment of wages common. It has also assisted workers in the construction industry, where it has demanded an end to discrimination against Chinese construction workers.

=== Garment industry activities ===
CSWA is very active in opposing unhealthy and illegally working conditions in New York City's garment industry. Abuse of workers in the industry is high. A United States Department of Labor study in 1997 found that 90 percent of the 3,000 garment manufacturing shops in New York City's Chinatown were sweatshops. About 70 percent of the shops are owned by ethnic Chinese. Most employers pay by the piece rather than the legally required minimum wage, and violations of wage and overtime standards are common. Injuries are frequent, and some of them crippling, but workplace safety laws are rarely enforced and few employers participate as required in the state workers' compensation system.

Since 1981, the Chinese Staff and Workers' Association has sponsored a number of programs to assist garment workers, almost all of them women, in addressing workplace problems. For example, CSWA has launched manufacturing accountability campaigns to require manufacturers as well as contractors to pay wages. The organization filed a successful class action lawsuit for back wages, and has a number of other legal actions pending.

In 1996, CSWA founded the National Mobilization Against Sweatshops (NMASS) to help bring an end to sweatshop labor. NMASS has launched a number of highly publicized campaigns for corporate accountability. Its most famous effort involved DKNY, which was alleged to have permitted its contractors to underpay workers and fire those who protested their treatment.

=== Anti-Displacement activities ===
CSWA sued the City of NY in 1986, Chinese Staff and Workers Association et al., Appellants, v. City of New York et al., Respondents, for green lighting Henry Street Tower, a luxury residential development, arguing that the displacement of neighborhood residents and businesses caused by a proposed project is an environmental impact within the purview of SEQRA and CEQR, and the failure of respondents to consider these potential effects renders their environmental analysis invalid.
