= 1982 garment workers' strike =

The 1982 garment workers' strike, organized by the International Ladies Garment Workers Union (ILGWU), was the largest strike in the history of New York City's Chinatown.

== History ==
In 1982, New York City's Chinatown was home to approximately 500 garment factories employing 20,000 members of the ILGWU Local 23-25. Most of the Chinatown workers were immigrant women from Hong Kong and southern China. Hazardous working conditions, long hours, and payment based on piecework rather than the 1981 minimum wage of $3.35 (~$12.00 in 2025) an hour, were some of the problems that workers sought to address. Every three years, the ILGWU negotiated a new contract on behalf of its 150,000 members throughout the northeastern United States: first with the manufacturers, then with the contractors. Manufacturers were represented by the American Apparel Manufacturers Association (AAMA). Contractors were represented by the Greater Blouse, Skirt and Undergarment Association (GBSUA). Under the agreement, the union would call a strike on any manufacturer or contractor that used a non-union firm.

That year, the Chinatown contractors rejected the contract negotiated by the GBSUA and presented their own list of demands. Among other things, they maintained that the union, not the contractors, should provide holiday pay; overtime should be calculated on a weekly, rather than a daily, basis; and contractors should be free to do business with non-union manufacturers if union work was not immediately available. They threatened to secede from the GBSUA if their demands were not met.

The union and the Chinese contractors launched competing propaganda campaigns to win over the workers. Chinese employers tried to play on workers' ethnic loyalties to get them to side against the white-dominated union. ILGWU president Sol Chaikin, meanwhile, called the contractors' demands "an attempt to create a Taiwan in the United States and turn the union clock back fifty years." Ultimately the workers chose the union. Thousands of union members formed a Committee to Defend the Union Contract. Volunteering after work and on weekends, they spread the word in the factories and on the street, handed out leaflets, organized phone banks, and made appearances on local television and radio. Among the organizers were Shui Mak Ka, Lily Moy, Alice Tse, Alice Ip, and Katie Quan.

On June 24, 1982, nearly 20,000 garment workers rallied in Columbus Park, carrying banners and picket signs. Speakers included Jay Mazur, then the manager of Local 23-25, who told the workers, "We are one!" Afterwards, the crowd marched through Chinatown. As Katie Quan recalled later, "It was an exhilarating moment. Thousands upon thousands of Chinese immigrant women had come together to stand up for themselves."

Within a few days, all but a few dozen of the Chinatown contractors had pledged to sign the union contract. To persuade the rest, the union organized a second rally on June 29, and warned them that after the rally, they would strike any contractor who had not signed the pledge. The second rally attracted as large a crowd as the first. Within hours, all the contractors had signed the pledge, and the strike ended in victory for the union.
