= Workers' Awaaz =

American domestic workers' group

Workers' Awaaz (or "Workers' Voice") is a nonprofit, nonpartisan female domestic workers' group based in New York City. Although the group supports all women in domestic services, its primary focus is on women from South Asia (India, Pakistan, Bangladesh, Sri Lanka and Nepal).

Workers' Awaaz was founded in June 1997 by a group of South Asian women activists and domestic workers. Workers' Awaaz assists workers in ensuring that they are paid the minimum wage, receive overtime pay, are aware of their rights under workers' compensation laws, and receive training in basic employee rights and protection under state and federal law. The organization also sues employers on behalf of domestic workers for violations of federal and state laws, and organizes pickets and demonstrations against abusive employers.

Workers' Awaaz also works to build public awareness of the sometimes abusive conditions under which many South Asian domestic workers labor in the U.S.

Since many immigrant domestics are isolated by language, working conditions and restrictions placed on them by employers, Workers' Awaaz uses a variety of outreach efforts to reach workers in need. It places advertisements in various South Asian-related newspapers, sets up tables at South Asian community events, and engages in face-to-face conversations in markets and stores.

== Lawsuits ==
Workers' Awaaz has won several lawsuits filed on behalf of workers against employers who did not pay minimum wage, withhold taxes or make Social Security and other required government payments.

In 1998, Workers' Awaaz, working with the American Civil Liberties Union, won a $20,000 back pay settlement. In January 2000, the organization won a back pay award for $50,000 from physicians who refused to pay a domestic worker for nearly three years.

== Awards and grants ==
In 1997, Workers' Awaaz won a $5,000 grassroots grant from the Ben & Jerry's Foundation.

In 1998, Ahmed was honored as a fellow of the Petra Foundation for her advocacy work with Workers' Awaaz. In 2000, the organization was awarded a Union Square Award from the Tides Center for its grassroots activism and strengthening of immigrant communities in New York City.

In 2000, Shahbano Aliani, M. Bala, Shahensha Begum, Rekha Devi, Rokeya Mollah and Rokeya Begum—lead organizers and board members—received the Union Square Award from the Fund for the City of New York.
