= America's Economic Supremacy =

1900 essays by Brooks Adams

- Cover of America's Economic Supremacy (1900 edition)
- Author: Brooks Adams
- Language: English
- Subject: Global politics United States economy Comparative analysis
- Publisher: The Macmillan Company
- Publication date: 1900
- Publication place: United States

America's Economic Supremacy is a collection of six essays written by Brooks Adams and published in 1900, arguing that the United States would soon attain global hegemony following the Spanish–American War and decline of the British Empire and advocating for policies of nationalization and consolidation to maintain efficient competition with rival nations.

Building on the thesis of his 1895 magnum opus, The Law of Civilization and Decay, Adams argues that the seat of power follows the movement of the center of commercial exchanges and would next relocate to the United States, where it would remain until it was overtaken by the industrial development of Asia. To ensure survival and avoid the decline of all Western civilization, Adams argued that the United States must seek to project its influence over Europe, Asia, and the world. He further predicted that an alliance between Great Britain and the United States was "almost inevitable" and that the world would soon be divided between the maritime alliance of these two powers and the land powers of Germany and Russia.

== Background ==
In 1895–98, Brooks Adams published The Law of Civilization and Decay, arguing that throughout history the seat of power had followed the movement of the center of exchanges.

In 1896, Adams moved to his brother Henry's home in Washington, where he gained significant social and political influence. Among the Hay–Adams social circle, Brooks was the most enthusiastic advocate of a war with Spain over their colonial rule in Cuba. After the outbreak of the Spanish–American War and resounding naval victory at Manila Bay, Adams was hailed as prophetic and gained a following among Washington politicians and the broader public. He publicly expressed his belief that America would develop a great empire including a portion of Asia, and he supported American rule in the Philippines.

As his influence grew, Adams began to lobby through his connections in Washington, arguing that the United States was a confident, rising power with which Europe and international monetary powers could not compete. He argued to his brother Henry that American supremacy had ended the chapter of history which had begun with the French Revolution and predicted an end of the two-party American political system in favor of an era of "panim et circensis" in which the proletariat "is to be bought and sold." After visits to Germany and Russia, he returned to Washington, staying with the Lodges and seeking greater influence in the William McKinley administration. At this time, he left the Democratic Party to join Roosevelt, Lodge, and other Republicans in advocating for global American hegemony.

== Synopsis ==
=== Preface ===
Adams builds on the thesis of The Law of Civilization and Decay by arguing that most great historical catastrophes occurred because of the precipitate movement of the international center of empire and wealth from one people to another. After the most recent such catastrophe, the French Revolution, capital had relocated from continental Europe to London. Adams predicted that the seat of wealth and power would relocate to America, where it would remain until overtaken by the industrial development of Asia. To avoid the downfall of the United States and of all Western civilization, he argued, America must seek to project its influence over Asia, Europe, and the world. He further predicted "a new centralisation, of which Russia is one pole, and [the United States] the other, with England between" and that an alliance between Great Britain and the United States was "almost inevitable."

=== The Spanish War and the Equilibrium of the World ===
In the first article, Adams predicted that the American victory at Manila Bay had heralded an era of total war, and he drew on the theories of Alexander Hamilton to argue that the economy should be directed by a combination of the state and business leaders. By synthesizing the theories of Alfred Thayer Mahan, Karl Pearson, Hippolyte Taine, and his own views, he argued for a military alliance with Great Britain in order to establish a maritime trading empire in competition with Germany and Russia, for the prize of trade with Asia.

=== The New Struggle for Life Among Nations and England's Decadence in the West Indies ===
In his next two articles, Adams furthered these theories, by observing that German sugar subsidies had undercut prices and flooded British markets, resulting in the collapse of the plantation system, the revolution in Spanish Cuba, and the Spanish-American War. He further observed that on a large scale, these German subsidies had led to the collapse of the last vestiges of Great Britain's agricultural economy, forcing the British to sell American investments to buy food products abroad and precipitating the Panic of 1893. Thus, Adams argued that the United States should keep pace by adopting the policies of national collectivism and consolidation advocated by Hamilton and practiced in Germany, as opposed to the decadent, individualistic policies of Great Britain, while implicitly blaming Germany for the recent economic depression. He also called for construction of the long-proposed canal between the Atlantic and Pacific oceans. Adams was influenced by Andrew Carnegie's article "The Gospel of Wealth" in the North American Review, which posited that successful men functioned as public stewards. Therefore, Adams believed that industrial societies needed to consolidate in the hands of strong men in order to maintain efficient production and competition.

=== Natural Selection in Literature and The Decay of England ===
In the fourth article, subtitled "An Essay Illustrating Certain Recent Changes in the Character of the Population of Great Britain," Adams argued that these economic cycles are reflected in cultural trends, taking as an example the decline in the quality of courage in popular British literature from the time of Walter Scott to Charles Dickens. Whereas Scott, writing in a rural environment, extolled bravery, adventure, and battle and the virtues of family and religion, Dickens, setting his novels in primarily urban settings, had chronicled a new mode of thinking driven by fear. Adams cites the Dickens character Kate Nickleby, a heroine born to "semi-imbecile" parents, as an example of Dickens's distaste for inherited qualities.

Adams furthers his argument in the next article, "The Decay of England," which was previously unpublished. It begins in the vein of Auguste Comte and Herbert Spencer, "Human society is a complete living organism, with circulation, heart, and members." Adams argues that shifting the "heart," which he took to be the economic center of the world, would lead to catastrophe.

=== Russia's Interest in China ===
The book concludes with an assessment of current events, particularly Russian expansion in China and American interests in the region. Adams predicts that in order to survive, Russia would undergo a social revolution internally, expand externally, or both. "Were the Russians and the Germans to coalesce in order to dominate Northern China," Adams predicted, "a strain of a very serious nature might be put upon America."

== Reception ==
=== Contemporary reaction ===
Soon after publication, Adams sent the book to his brother Henry, who responded, "If, as you once hinted, I haven't seemed to be particularly enthusiastic about your later work, it has been only because I was chiefly interested in the theory, and you in its application. As yet I have not got the theory complete, and I cannot feel certain of its results." He added that he did not "so much care for a guess." Henry disagreed that America could prevent British collapse, harboring "a secret belief that one stands on the brink of the world's greatest catastrophe. For it means the fall of Western Europe, as it fell in the fourth century."

Professional reviews of America's Economic Supremacy were mixed. One anonymous review in The People, the official publication of the Socialist Labor Party of America, praised the work as applying the materialistic philosophy of history to current events and doing unconscious reverence to Karl Marx, Friedrich Engels, and other socialist thinkers. The People reviewer credited Adams with influencing the contemporary work Expansion Under New World Conditions by Josiah Strong, though Strong had been publishing in support of a muscular Christian socialist form of Anglo-Saxon imperialism since 1885.

=== Legacy ===
America's Economic Supremacy has been cited as a harbinger of the American Century, particularly with respect to geopolitical competition with Russia and the Cold War. In the foreword to the 1947 edition, Marquis Childs wrote, "If Adams had written last year, for publication this year, he would have had to alter scarcely anything to relate his views to the world of today." In 1955, Adams biographer Arthur Beringause further noted that Adams predicted the Russo-Japanese War and Russian Revolution, as well as the trends of corporate consolidation and coordination between industry and government which were realized through Adams's influence in the Square Deal.

== See also ==
- The Law of Civilization and Decay
- Causes of World War I
- Josiah Strong
- Origins of the Cold War
- Social Darwinism
