= Sabbath Eve in a Coal Cellar, Ludlow Street =

Photograph by Jacob Riis

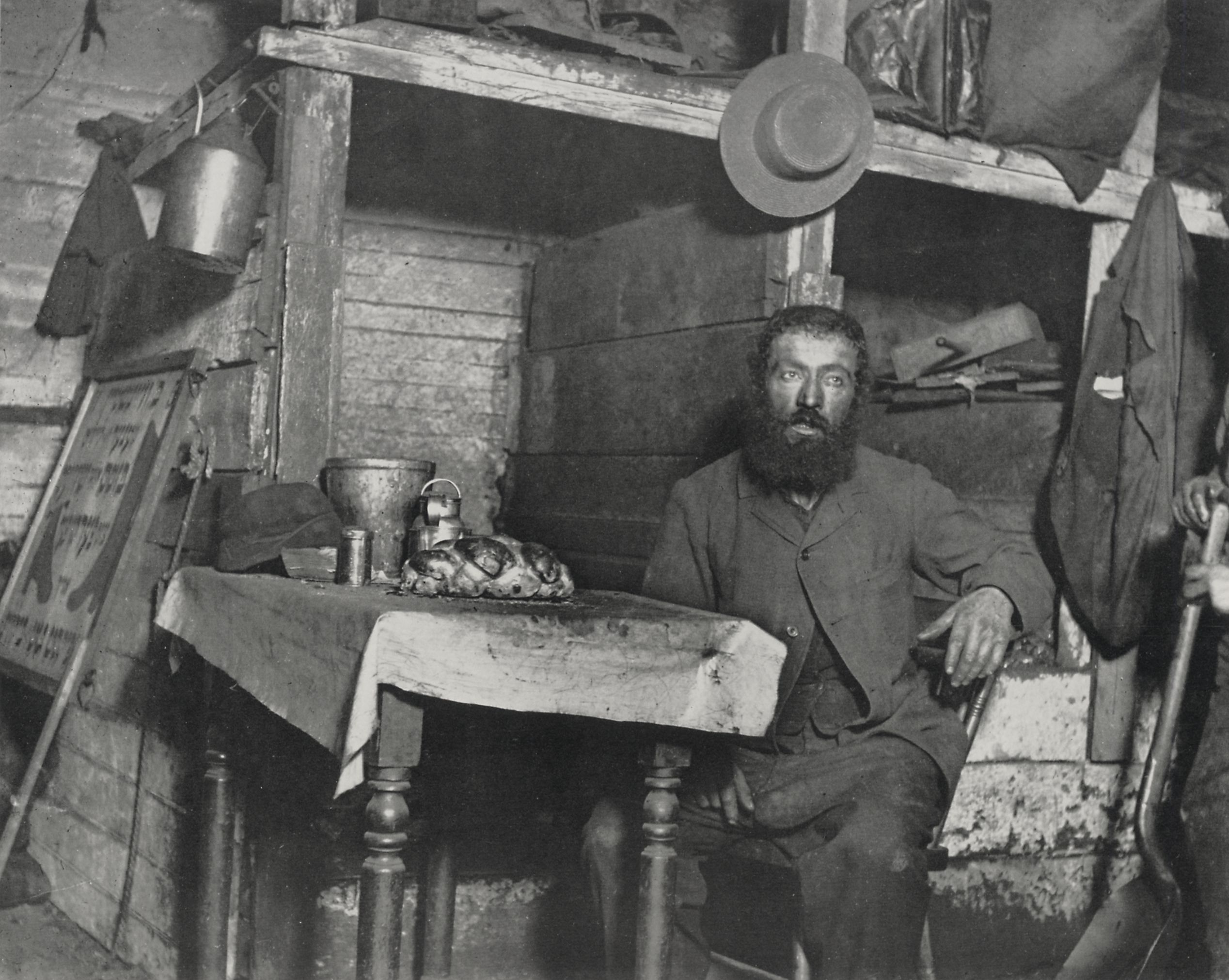
Sabbath Eve in a Coal Cellar, Ludlow Street (c. 1890) by Jacob Riis

Sabbath Eve in a Coal Cellar, Ludlow Street is a black and white photograph taken by Danish American photographer Jacob Riis, probably c. 1890.

== Description ==
Riis in his photographic and journalistic work documented the working life of emigrants of many different origins, like the Italians, the Irish, the Chinese and the Jews. This photograph became one of the most idiosyncratic depictions of Jewish emigrants in New York in the late 19th-century. It was taken at Ludlow Street, on the Lower East Side of Manhattan, and depicts a Jewish man, sturdy and bearded, poorly dressed, with his hat hanging above him on a peg, most likely an emigrant, who is celebrating the Jewish festivity of the Sabbath in a very poor environment, which is the coal cellar where he lives and works as a cobbler. The man does have a table prepared for the celebration, covered with a cloth and with the braided bread known as challah, and other utensils, in an attempt to maintain the tradition with dignity in a very poor place. To the left it's visible a placard written in Yiddish. To the right, a man is barely visible, carrying a shovel, probably a working companion, since he was almost totally cropped from the photograph. The surprised look of the man is most likely due to the effect the flash photographs used by Riis sometimes had on the people he captured on camera, often without their permission.

== Public collections ==
There are prints of this photograph at the Museum of Modern Art, in New York, the Museum of the City of New York, and at the International Center of Photography, in New York.
