= Mary Elizabeth Phillips =

Mary Elizabeth Phillips may refer to:

- Beth Phillips (born 1969), United States district judge
- Mary Phillips (suffragette) (1880–1969), English suffragette, feminist and socialist
- Mary Elizabeth Phillips (physician) (1875–1956), first woman from Cardiff University to qualify as a medical doctor

== See also ==
- Mary Phillips (disambiguation)
