= Mary Phillips =

Mary Phillips may refer to:

- Mary Catherine Phillips (1903–1981), American consumer advocate and author
- Mary Elizabeth Phillips (physician) (1875–1956), Welsh first woman from Cardiff University to qualify as a medical doctor
- Mary G. Phillips (1903–1980), superintendent of the United States Army Nurse Corps
- Mary Hakken-Phillips, American attorney and politician
- Mary Jane Phillips (1931–2024), Canadian chemical engineer
- Mary Louise Phillips, American neuropsychiatry researcher at the University of Pittsburgh
- Beth Phillips (Mary Elizabeth Phillips, born 1969), United States district judge
- Mary Phillips (suffragette) (1880–1969), English suffragette, feminist, and socialist
- Mary Walker Phillips (1923–2007), American artist, author, and teacher
- Mary Phillips Riis (1877–1967), née Phillips, American philanthropist
- Mary Seward Phillips Eskridge (1883–1967), née Phillips, American suffragist and clubwoman

== See also ==
- Mary Philips (1901–1975), American stage- and film actress
- Mary Philipse (1730–1825), Anglo-Dutch colonial American heiress
- Mary Phillip (born 1977), English international footballer and football team manager
