= Jacob Riis =

American photographer, journalist and activist (1849–1914)

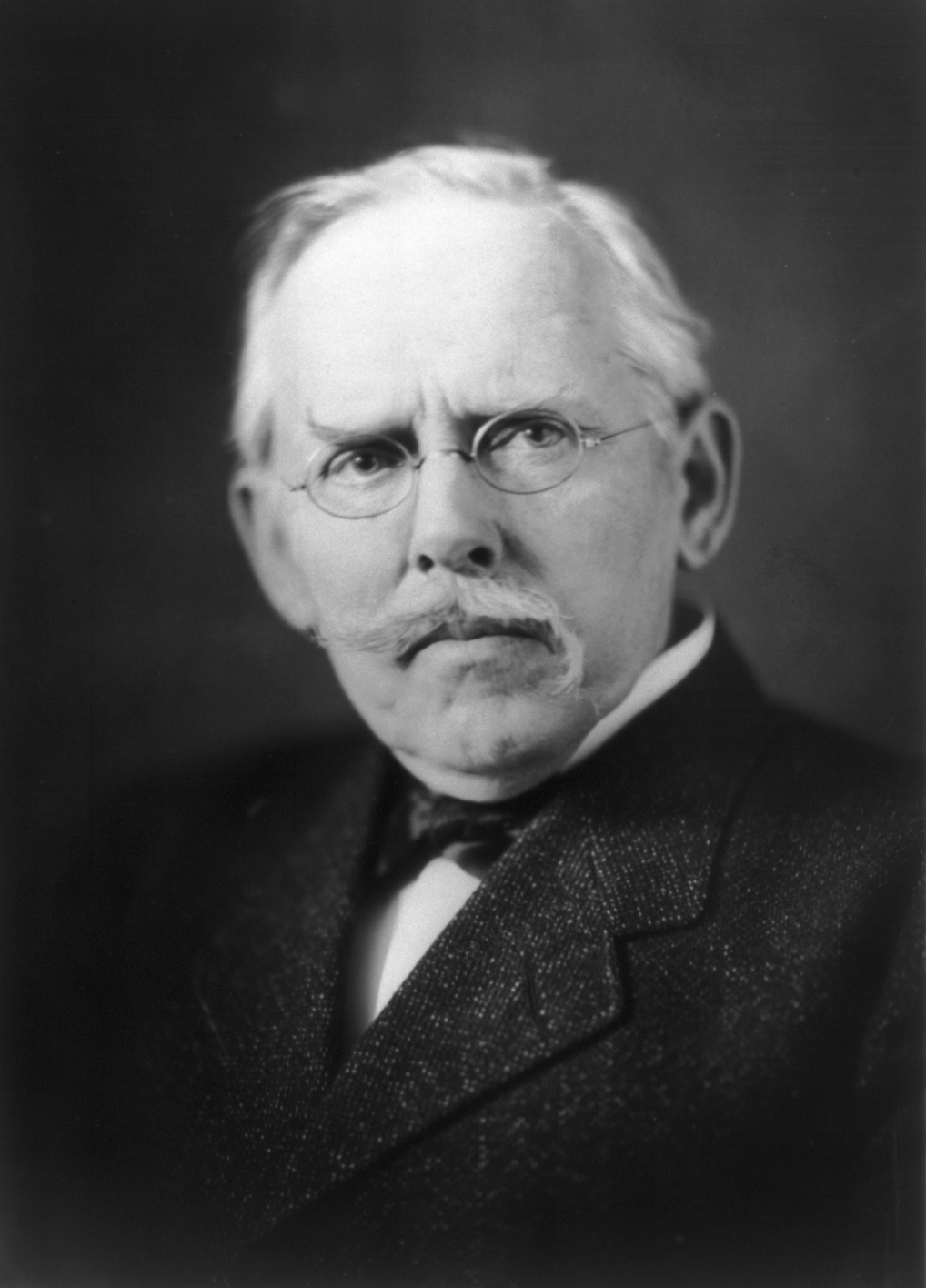
- Riis in 1906
- Born: May 3, 1849; Ribe, Denmark
- Died: May 26, 1914 (aged 65); Barre, Massachusetts, U.S.
- Occupations: Photographer; journalist; activist
- Known for: Social reform

Jacob August Riis (/riːs/ REESS; May 3, 1849 – May 26, 1914) was a Danish-American social reformer, "muck-raking" journalist, and social documentary photographer. He contributed significantly to the cause of urban reform in the United States of America at the turn of the 20th century. He is known for using his photographic and journalistic talents to help the impoverished in New York City; those impoverished New Yorkers were the subject of most of his prolific writings and photography.

Riis endorsed the implementation of "model tenements" in New York with the help of humanitarian Lawrence Veiller. He was an early proponent of the newly practicable casual photography and one of the first to adopt photographic flash. While living in New York, Riis experienced poverty and became a police reporter writing about the quality of life in the slums. He sought to expose the poor living conditions of poor people to the middle and upper classes in order to show the need for measures to alleviate them.

== Early life ==
Born on May 3, 1849 in Ribe, Denmark, Jacob Riis was the third of 15 children (one of whom, an orphaned niece, was fostered) of Niels Edward Riis, a schoolteacher and writer for the local Ribe newspaper, and Carolina Riis (née Bendsine Lundholm), a homemaker. Of the 15, only Jacob, one sister, and the foster sister survived into the twentieth century. Riis was influenced by his father, whose school Riis delighted in disrupting. His father persuaded him to read and improve his English via Charles Dickens's magazine All the Year Round and the novels of James Fenimore Cooper.

Jacob reportedly had a happy childhood, but experienced tragedy at the age of eleven when his brother Theodore, a year younger, drowned. He never forgot his mother's grief.

At age eleven or twelve, he donated all the money he had to a poor Ribe family, living in a squalid house if they cleaned it. The tenants took the money and obliged. When he told his mother, she went to help.

Though his father hoped that Jacob would have a literary career, Jacob wanted to be a carpenter. When he was 16, he became fond of Elisabeth Gjørtz, the 12-year-old adopted daughter of the owner of the company for which he worked as an apprentice carpenter. The father disapproved of the boy's blundering attentions, and Riis was forced to travel to Copenhagen to complete his carpentry apprenticeship. In 1868, Riis returned to Ribe at age 19. Discouraged by poor job availability in the region and Gjørtz's disfavor of his marriage proposal, Riis decided to emigrate to the United States.

=== Migration to the United States ===
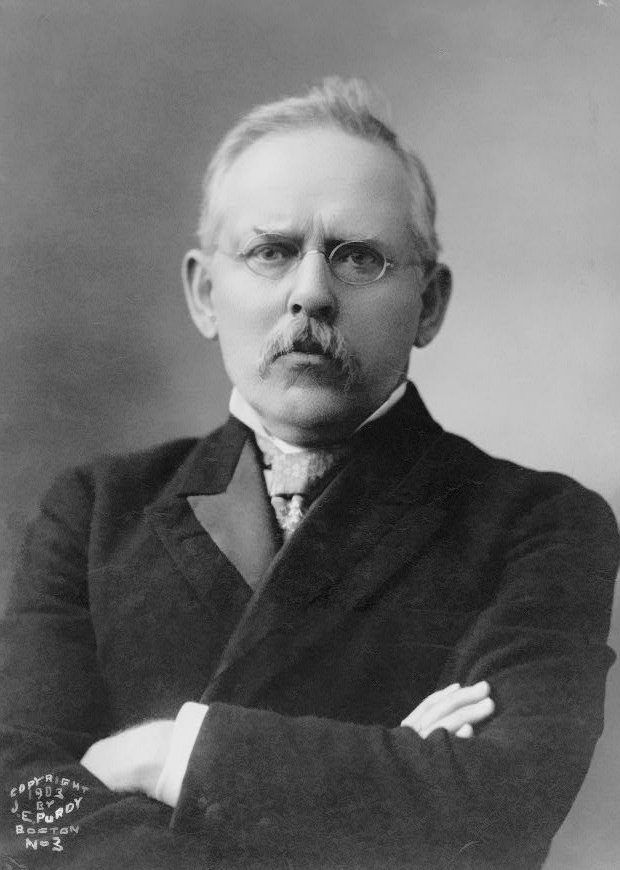
Riis c. 1903

Riis immigrated to America in 1870, when he was 21 years old, seeking employment as a carpenter. He first traveled in a small boat from Copenhagen to Glasgow, where on May 18 he boarded the steamer Iowa, traveling in steerage. He carried 40 dollars donated by friends (he had paid $50 for the passage himself); a gold locket with a strand of Elisabeth's hair, presented by her mother; and letters of introduction to the Danish Consul, Mr. Goodall (later president of the American Bank Note Company), a friend of the family since his rescue from a shipwreck at Ribe. Riis disembarked in New York on June 5, on that day spending half of the $40 his friends had given him on a revolver for defense against human or animal predators.

When Riis arrived in New York City, he was one of a large number of migrants and immigrants, seeking prosperity in a more industrialized environment, who came to urban areas in the years after the American Civil War. Twenty-four million people relocated to urban areas, causing their population to increase eightfold. The demographics of American urban areas became significantly more heterogeneous as many immigrants arrived, creating ethnic enclaves often more populous than many of the cities of their homelands. "In the 1880s 334,000 people were crammed into a single square mile of the Lower East Side, making it the most densely populated place on earth. They were packed into filthy, disease-ridden tenements, 10 or 15 to a room, and the well-off knew nothing about them and cared less."

After five days, during which he used almost all his money, Riis found work as a carpenter at Brady's Bend Iron Works on the Allegheny River above Pittsburgh. After a few days of that, he began mining for increased pay, but quickly resumed carpentry. Learning on July 19, 1870, that France had declared war on Germany, he expected that Denmark would join France to avenge the Prussian seizure of Schleswig, and determined to fight for France. He returned to New York, and, having pawned most of his possessions and without money, attempted to enlist at the French consulate, but was told that there was no plan to send a volunteer army from America. Pawning his revolver, he walked out of New York City and collapsed from exhaustion. On waking, he walked to Fordham College where a Catholic priest served him breakfast.

After a brief period of farm working and odd jobs at Mount Vernon, New York, Riis returned to New York City, where he read in The New York Sun that the newspaper was recruiting soldiers for the war. Riis rushed there to enlist, but the editor, whom he later realized was Charles Anderson Dana, claimed or affected ignorance, but offered the famished Riis a dollar for breakfast; Riis indignantly refused. Riis was destitute, at one time sleeping on a tombstone and surviving on windfall apples. Still, he found work at a brickyard at Little Washington in New Jersey, and was there for six weeks until he heard that a group of volunteers was going to the war. Thereupon he left for New York.

On arrival, Riis found that the rumor was true but that he had arrived too late. He pleaded with the French consul, who expelled him. He made other attempts to enlist, none successful. As autumn began, Riis was destitute, without a job. He survived on scavenged food and handouts from Delmonico's Restaurant, and slept in public areas or in a foul-smelling police lodging-house. At one point, Riis's only companion was a stray dog. One morning he awoke in a police lodging-house to find that his gold locket, with its strand of Elisabeth's hair, had been stolen. He complained to the sergeant, who became enraged and expelled him. Riis was devastated. The story became a favorite of Riis's.

One of his personal victories, he later confessed, was not using his eventual fame to ruin the career of the offending officer. Disgusted, he left New York, buying a passage on a ferry with the silk handkerchief that was his last possession. By doing odd jobs and stowing away on freight trains, Riis eventually reached Philadelphia, where he appealed to the Danish Consul, Ferdinand Myhlertz, for help and was cared for, for two weeks by the Consul and his wife.

Myhlertz sent Riis, now dressed properly in a suit, to the home of an old classmate in Jamestown, New York, in the western part of the state. Riis worked as a carpenter throughout the Scandinavian enclave in surrounding communities, and performed a variety of other assorted jobs. He achieved sufficient financial stability to find the time to experiment as a writer, in both Danish and English, although his attempt to get a job at a Buffalo, New York newspaper was unsuccessful, and magazines repeatedly rejected his submissions.

Riis was in much demand as a carpenter, a major reason being the low prices he charged. After a while, Riis returned to New York City. He was most successful as a salesman, particularly of flatirons and fluting irons, becoming promoted to the sales representative of them for the state of Illinois. In Chicago, he was cheated of both his money and his stock and had to return to an earlier base in Pittsburgh where he found that the subordinates he had left to sell in Pennsylvania had cheated him in the same manner. With funds tight, and while bedridden with a fever, Riis learned from a letter that Elisabeth, the former object of his affection, was engaged to a cavalry officer. Once recovered from his illness, Riis returned to New York City, selling flatirons along the way.

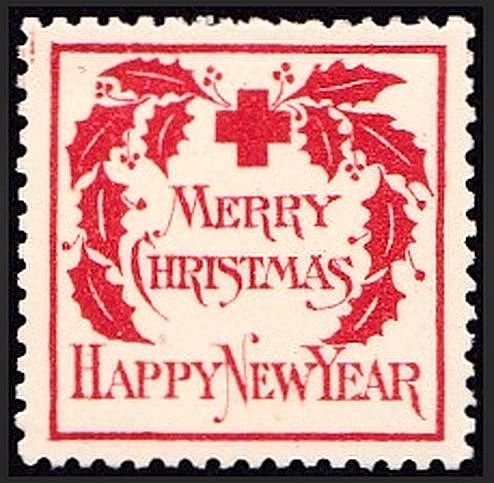
The first US Christmas seal, 1907 issue

In his earlier years, Riis had lost six of his brothers to tuberculosis, which was occurring in alarming proportions in Europe and the United States. In 1906 Riis received a letter from a family member in Denmark, with a postage stamp and Christmas seal affixed to it, informing him of the great success Christmas seals were experiencing in Denmark in raising funds to fight tuberculosis. Given the plight that befell his brothers, Riis became very interested, especially in the efforts of Einar Holbøll who was responsible for issuing the Christmas seals sold in Danish post offices. The sale of Christmas seals had experienced great success in Denmark and Sweden.

Inspired by the news, Riis was compelled to write an article in a magazine about the dreaded disease and the success of Christmas seals, entitled "Christmas stamps", urging that such a program be adopted in the United States. Though his idea was supported by a few doctors and hospitals, it was generally shrugged off by the wider population, who assumed there was simply no way to deal with the disease. When Emily Bissell, secretary of the Delaware Red Cross, read Riis's article she thought the idea had great promise. After overcoming initial skepticism she persuaded a printer to produce 50,000 Christmas seals on credit. After getting permission from the Delaware Postmaster, they were sold in various post offices in Delaware. The idea quickly took hold. Through the efforts of Jacob Riis and Emily Bissell, along with the Red Cross, the first Christmas seals saw great success in raising funds in the United States in 1907 and thereafter.

== Career ==
=== Early journalism ===
Riis noticed an advertisement by a Long Island newspaper looking for an editor, he applied and was appointed city editor. He quickly realized why the job had been available: the editor-in-chief was dishonest and indebted. Riis left within two weeks.

Once again unemployed, Riis returned to the Five Points neighborhood. He was sitting outside the Cooper Union one day when the principal of the school where he had earlier learned telegraphy happened to notice him. He said that if Riis had nothing better to do, then the New York News Association was looking for a trainee. After one more night and a hurried wash in a horse trough, Riis went for an interview. Despite his disheveled appearance, he was sent for a test assignment to observe and write about a luncheon at the Astor House. Riis covered the event competently and got the job.

Riis was able to write about both the rich and impoverished immigrant communities. He did his job well and was promoted to editor of a weekly newspaper, the News. However, this newspaper, the periodical of a political group, soon became bankrupt. Around the same time, Riis got a letter from home informing him that both his older brothers, an aunt, and Elisabeth Gjørtz's fiancé had died. Riis wrote to Elisabeth to propose, and with $75 of his savings and promissory notes, he bought the News company.

Riis worked hard at his newspaper and soon paid his debts. Newly independent, he was able to target the politicians who had previously been his employers. Meanwhile, he received a provisional acceptance from Elisabeth, who asked him to come to Denmark for her, saying "We will strive together for all that is noble and good". Conveniently, the politicians offered to buy back the newspaper for five times the price Riis had paid; he was thus able to arrive in Denmark with a substantial amount of money.

After some months in Denmark, the newly married couple arrived in New York. Riis worked briefly as editor of a south Brooklyn newspaper, the Brooklyn News. To supplement his income, he used a "magic lantern" projector to advertise in Brooklyn, projecting either onto a sheet hung between two trees or onto a screen behind a window. The novelty was a success, and Riis and a friend relocated to upstate New York and Pennsylvania as itinerant advertisers. However, this enterprise ended when the pair became involved in an armed dispute between striking railroad workers and the police, after which Riis quickly returned to New York City.

=== Years at the Tribune ===
A neighbor of Riis, who was the city editor of the New-York Tribune, recommended Riis for a short-term contract. Riis did well and was offered the job of police reporter. He was based in a press office across from police headquarters on Mulberry Street. "Nicknamed 'Death's Thoroughfare'", Riis's biographer Alexander Alland writes, "It was here, where the street crooks its elbow at the Five Points, that the streets and numerous alleys radiated in all directions, forming the foul core of the New York slums."

During these stints as a police reporter, Riis worked the most crime-ridden and impoverished slums of the city. Through his own experiences in the poorhouses, and witnessing the conditions of the poor in the city slums, he decided to make a difference for them. Working night-shift duty in the immigrant communities of Manhattan's Lower East Side, Riis developed a tersely melodramatic writing style and he became one of the earliest reformist journalists.

=== Photography ===
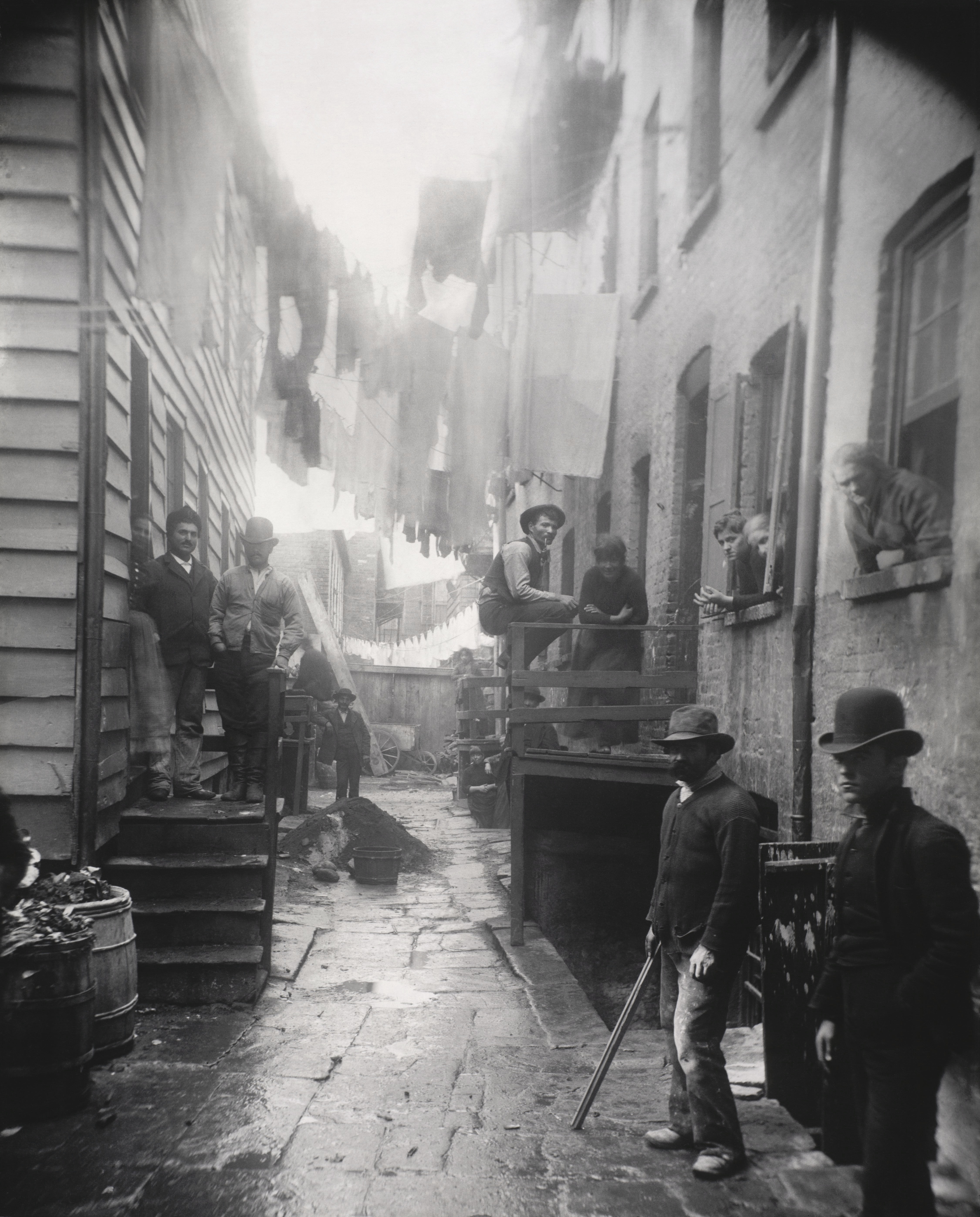
Bandits' Roost, 59 1/2 Mulberry Street (1888) by Jacob Riis, from How the Other Half Lives. This portrays the infamous Mulberry Bend, which was transformed into Mulberry Park in 1897 due to Riis's efforts

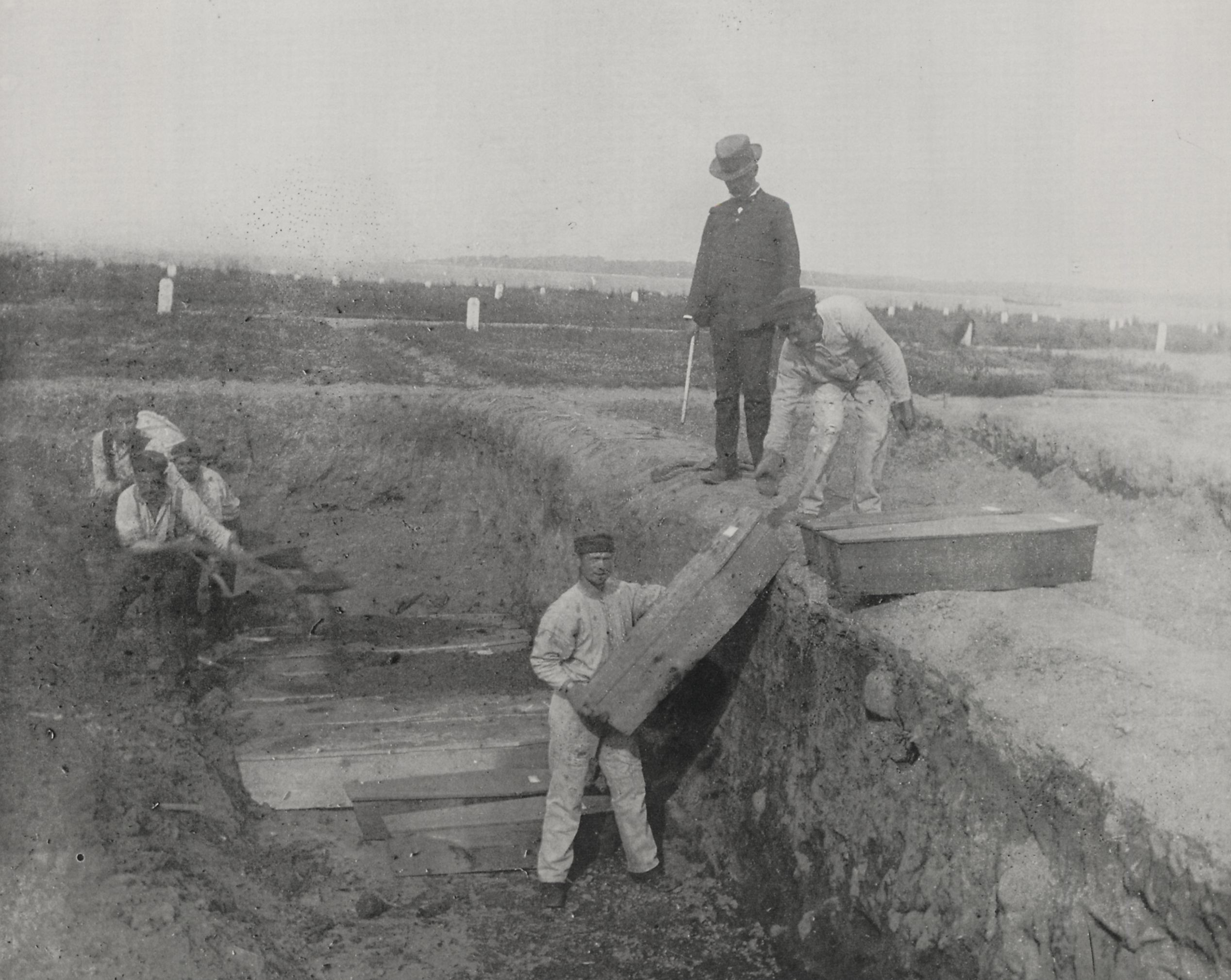
The Trench in Potter's Field (1890) by Jacob Riis. Laborers loading coffins into an open trench at the city burial ground on Hart's Island.

Riis wondered how to show the squalor of which he wrote more vividly than his words could express. He tried sketching but was incompetent at it. Camera lenses of the 1880s were slow, as was the emulsion of photographic plates; photography thus did not seem to be of any use for reporting about conditions of life in dark interiors. In early 1887, Riis was startled to read that "a way had been discovered to take pictures by flashlight. The darkest corner might be photographed that way." The German innovation, by Adolf Miethe and Johannes Gaedicke, flash powder was a mixture of magnesium with potassium chlorate and some antimony sulfide for added stability; the powder was used in a pistol-like device that fired cartridges. This was the introduction of flash photography.

Recognizing the potential of the flash, Riis informed a friend, John Nagle, chief of the Bureau of Vital Statistics in the City Health Department who was also a keen amateur photographer. Nagle found two more photographer friends, Henry Piffard and Richard Hoe Lawrence, and the four of them began to photograph the slums. Their first report was published in the New York newspaper The Sun on February 12, 1888; it was an unsigned article by Riis which described its author as "an energetic gentleman, who combines in his person, though not in practice, the two dignities of deacon in a Long Island church and a police reporter in New York". The "pictures of Gotham's crime and misery by night and day" are described as "a foundation for a lecture called 'The Other Half: How It Lives and Dies in New York.' to give at church and Sunday school exhibitions, and the like." The article was illustrated by twelve line drawings based on the photographs.

Riis and his photographers were among the first Americans to use flash photography. Pistol lamps were dangerous and looked threatening, and would soon be replaced by another method for which Riis lit magnesium powder on a frying pan. The process involved removing the lens cap, igniting the flash powder and replacing the lens cap; the time taken to ignite the flash powder sometimes allowed a visible image blurring created by the flash.

Riis's first team soon grew tired of the late hours, and Riis had to find other help. Both his assistants were lazy and one was dishonest, selling plates for which Riis had paid. Riis sued him in court successfully. Nagle suggested that Riis should become self-sufficient, so in January 1888, Riis paid $25 for a 4×5 box camera, plate holders, a tripod and equipment for developing and printing. He took the equipment to the potter's field cemetery on Hart Island to practice, making two exposures. The result was seriously overexposed but successful.

For three years, Riis combined his own photographs with others commissioned of professionals, donations by amateurs and purchased lantern slides, all of which formed the basis for his photographic archive.

Because of the nighttime work, he was able to photograph the worst elements of the New York slums, the dark streets, tenement apartments, and "stale-beer" dives, and documented the hardships faced by the poor and criminals, especially in the vicinity of notorious Mulberry Street.

In 1897, his photojournalism of Mulberry Street caused New York officials to transform the slum's "foul core" of Mulberry Bend into Mulberry Park. The park, today known as Columbus Park, significantly improved conditions in the neighborhood. Riis praised the park's creation, expressing that the youth now had a place to "romp in" and play, rather than "smashing lamps and windows and getting themselves arrested."

=== Public speaking ===
Riis accumulated a supply of photography and attempted to submit illustrated essays to magazines. But when an editor at Harper's New Monthly Magazine said that he liked the photographs but not the writing, and would find another writer, Riis was despondent about magazine publication and instead thought of speaking directly to the public.

This was not easy. The obvious venue would be a church, but several churches—including Riis's own—demurred, fearing either that the talks would offend the churchgoers' sensibilities or that they would offend rich and powerful landlords. Adolph Schauffler (of the City Mission Society) and Josiah Strong arranged to sponsor Riis's lecture at the Broadway Tabernacle church. Lacking money, Riis partnered with W. L. Craig, a Health Department clerk.

Riis and Craig's lectures, illustrated with lantern slides, made little money for the pair, but they both greatly increased the number of people exposed to what Riis had to say and also enabled him to meet people who had the power to effect change, notably Charles Henry Parkhurst and an editor of Scribner's Magazine, who invited him to submit an illustrated article.

The cover of the 1890 edition of How the Other Half Lives, photojournalism book by Riis

=== Books ===
An eighteen-page article by Riis, How the Other Half Lives, appeared in the Christmas 1889 edition of Scribner's Magazine. It included nineteen of his photographs rendered as line drawings. Its publication brought an invitation to expand the material into an entire book. Riis, who favored Henry George's 'single tax' system and absorbed George's theories and analysis, used that opportunity to attack landlords "with Georgian fervor".

Riis had already been thinking of writing a book and began writing it during nights. Days were for reporting for the New York Sun, evenings for public speaking. How the Other Half Lives, subtitled "Studies Among the Tenements of New York", was published in 1890. The book reused the eighteen line drawings that had appeared in the Scribner's article and also seventeen reproductions using the halftone method, and thus "[representing] the first extensive use of halftone photographic reproductions in a book". The magazine Sun and Shade had done the same for a year or so beginning 1888.

How the Other Half Lives sold well and was much quoted. Reviews were generally good, although some reviewers criticized it for oversimplifying and exaggerating. Riis attributed the success to a popular interest in social amelioration stimulated by William Booth's In Darkest England and the Way Out, and also to Ward McAllister's Society as I Have Found It, a portrait of the moneyed class. The book encouraged imitations such as Darkness and Daylight; or, Lights and Shadows of New York Life (1892), which somehow appropriated Riis's own photographs.

Children of the Poor (1892) was a sequel in which Riis wrote of particular children he had encountered.

The Making of an American (1901), an autobiography, follows Riis's early life in Denmark and his struggles as an immigrant in the United States. The book also describes how Riis became a reporter and how his work in immigrant enclaves kindled his desire for social reforms. Riis organized his autobiography chronologically, but each chapter illustrates a broader theme that America is a land of opportunity for those who are bold enough to take chances on their future. The autobiography is mostly straightforward, but Riis is not sure if his past should be told as a "love story", "if I am, to tell the truth ... I don't see how it can be helped." Although much of it is biographical, Riis also lays out his opinions about how immigrants like himself can succeed in the United States. Chapter 7 is distinct because Riis's wife, Elisabeth, describes her life in Denmark before she married Riis.

Whereas How the Other Half Lives, and some of Riis's other books received praise from critics, he received a mixed reception for his autobiography. A New York Times reviewer dismissed it as a vanity project written for "close and intimate friends". He admired Riis's "dogged pluck" and "indomitable optimism", but dismissed an "almost colossal egotism—made up of equal parts of vanity and conceit" as a major characteristic of the author. The reviewer anticipated the book would be "eagerly read by that large majority who have a craving and perennial interest in the personal and emotional incidents" within Riis's life.

Riis anticipated such a critique, "I have never been able to satisfactorily explain the great run 'How The Other Half Lives' had ... like Topsy, it grew." Other newspapers, such as the New York Tribune, published kinder reviews. Two years later, another reviewer reported that Riis's story was widely reprinted and dubbed him as one of the "best-known authors and ... one of the most popular lecturers in the United States."

The value of Riis's autobiography lies in the description of his origins as a social reformer. His early experiences in Ribe gave Riis a yardstick with which to measure tenement dwellers' quality of life. The account of the development of his powers of observation through his experiences as a poor immigrant lent authenticity to his news articles and larger works. Its themes of self-sufficiency, perseverance, and material success are prime examples of an archetype that successful Europeans like Riis used to demonstrate the exceptional opportunities that seem to exist only in the United States. In spite of its triumphalist outlook, The Making of an American remains useful as a source for students of immigration history and sociology who want to learn more about the author of How The Other Half Lives and the social reform movement that he helped to define.

=== Theodore Roosevelt ===
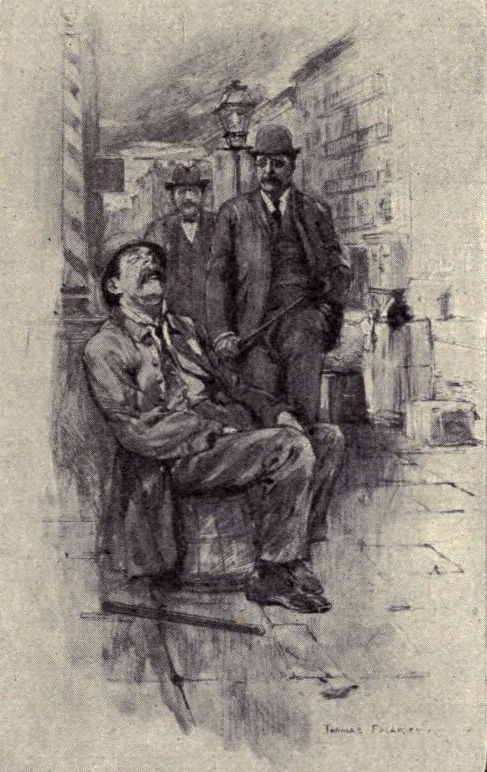
Riis walks the beat in New York City behind his friend and fellow reformer, NYC Police Commissioner, Theodore Roosevelt (1894 – Illustration from Riis's autobiography)

Jacob Riis had both a close friendship and on-going, professional relationship with political figure Theodore Roosevelt. Their relationship began in 1895 when Roosevelt was appointed as president of the Board of Commissioners of the New York City Police Department. He asked Riis to show him nighttime police work. During their first tour, the pair found that nine out of ten patrolmen were missing. Riis wrote about this for the next day's newspaper, and for the rest of Roosevelt's term the force was more attentive. Riis then continued to serve as an advisor to Roosevelt both on the local and eventually federal level.

Roosevelt was greatly inspired by Riis's work. He personally ensured the closure of the police-managed lodging rooms in which Riis had suffered during his first years in New York. After reading the exposés, Roosevelt was so deeply affected by Riis's sense of justice that he befriended Riis for life, later remarking, "Jacob Riis, whom I am tempted to call the best American I ever knew, although he was already a young man when he came hither from Denmark".

After Roosevelt became president, he wrote a tribute to Riis in the March 1901 edition of McClure's Magazine. He wrote:

Recently a man, well qualified to pass judgment, alluded to Mr. Jacob A. Riis as "the most useful citizen of New York". Those fellow citizens of Mr. Riis who best know his work will be most apt to agree with this statement. The countless evils which lurk in the dark corners of our civic institutions, which stalk abroad in the slums, and have their permanent abode in the crowded tenement houses, have met in Mr. Riis the most formidable opponent ever encountered by them in New York City.

Roosevelt's three-page tribute honored Jacob Riis for his gift of expression and his ability to make others see what he saw and feel what he felt. Roosevelt viewed Riis as a powerful promoter of change who allowed no failure to stop him from seeking reform. As long as Riis continued pursuing useful work, Roosevelt believed he would have no trouble receiving more than enough support.

Roosevelt believed society would benefit from more active reformers such as Riis. In fact, it was in part due to Riis's influence that Roosevelt instituted the White House Conference on Children as a means to aid the children exposed in How the Other Half Lives and Children of the Tenements.

For his part, Riis wrote a campaign biography of Roosevelt that praised him.

=== Public works ===
A particularly important effort by Riis was his exposure of the condition of New York's water supply. His five-column story "Some Things We Drink", in the August 21, 1891, edition of the New York Evening Sun, included six photographs (later lost). Riis wrote:

I took my camera and went up in the watershed photographing my evidence wherever I found it. Populous towns sewered directly into our drinking water. I went to the doctors and asked how many days a vigorous cholera bacillus may live and multiply in running water. About seven, said they. My case was made.

The story resulted in the purchase by New York City of areas around the New Croton Reservoir, and may well have saved New Yorkers from an epidemic of cholera.

Riis tried hard to have the slums around Five Points demolished and replaced with a park. His writings resulted in the Drexel Committee investigation of unsafe tenements; this resulted in the Small Park Act of 1887. Riis was not invited to the eventual opening of the park on June 15, 1897, but went all the same, together with Lincoln Steffens. In the last speech, the street cleaning commissioner credited Riis for the park and led the public in giving him three cheers of "Hooray, Jacob Riis!" Other parks also were created, and Riis was popularly credited with them as well.

== Later life and death ==
In 1901, Riis wrote his autobiography, The Making of an American. His daughter, Clara C. Riis, married William Clarence Fiske. His son, John Riis (1882–1946), served in Gifford Pinchot's new United States Forest Service from 1907 to 1913 as a ranger and forest supervisor on national forests in Utah, California and Oregon. He chronicled his time in the Forest Service in his 1937 book, Ranger Trails. Another son, Edward V. Riis, was appointed US Director of Public Information in Copenhagen toward the end of World War I; he spoke against antisemitism.

A third son, Roger Williams Riis (1894–1953), was also a reporter and activist. In 1905, Jacob Riis's wife Elisabeth became ill and died. Riis remarried in 1907, and with his new wife, Mary Phillips, relocated to a farm in Barre, Massachusetts.

Riis died at the farm on May 26, 1914. He is buried under an unmarked granite boulder in Riverside Cemetery, Barre, Massachusetts.

His second wife lived until 1967, continuing work on the farm, working on Wall Street and teaching classes at Columbia University.

== Social attitudes ==
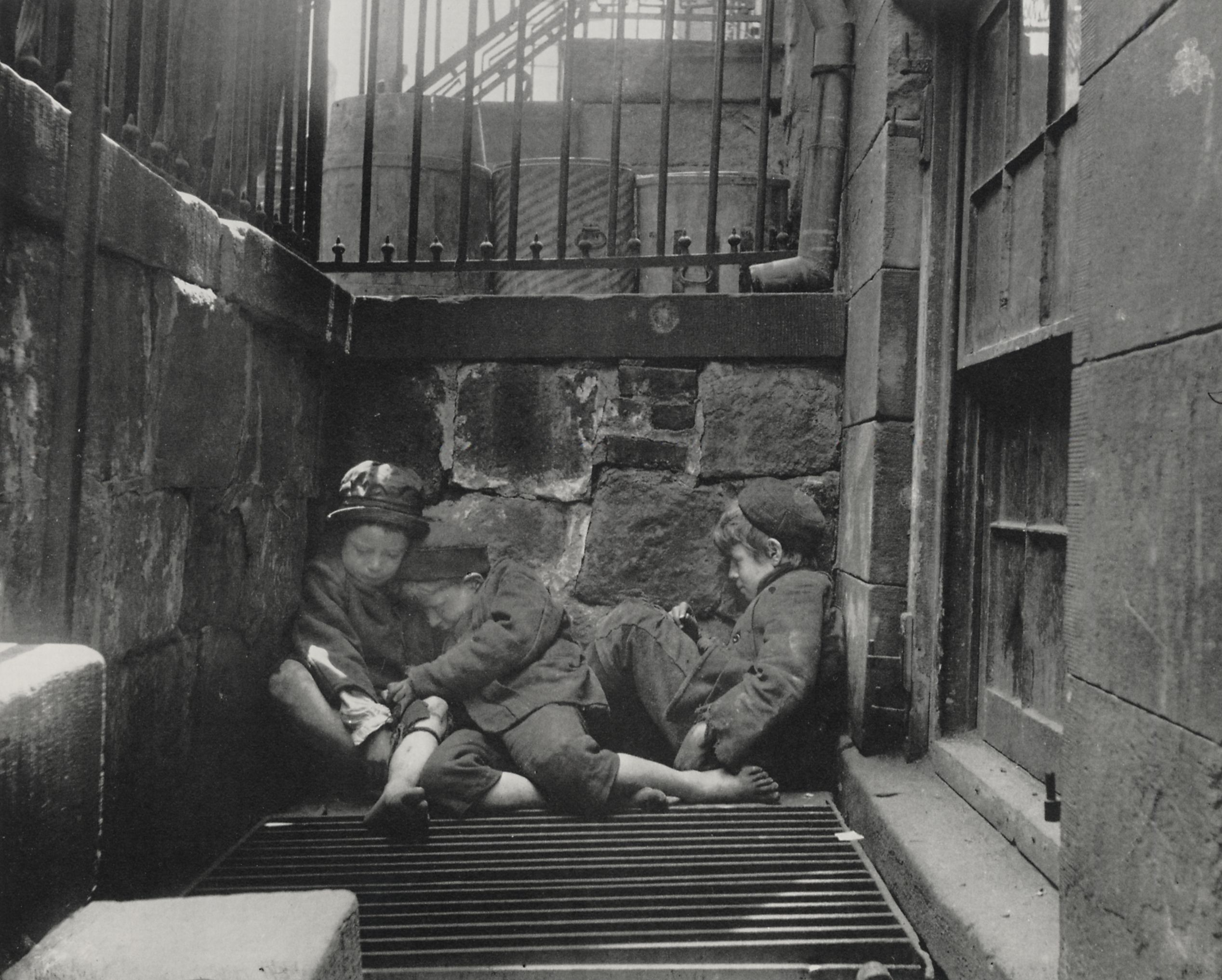
Street Arabs in the Area of Mulberry Street (c. 1890); sleeping homeless children, photographed by Riis

Riis's concern for the poor and destitute often caused people to assume he disliked the rich. However, Riis showed no sign of discomfort among the affluent, often asking them for their support. Although seldom involved with party politics, Riis was sufficiently disgusted by the corruption of Tammany Hall to change from being an endorser of the Democratic Party to endorse the Republican Party.

The period just before the Spanish–American War was difficult for Riis. He was approached by liberals who suspected that protests of alleged Spanish mistreatment of the Cubans was merely a ruse intended to provide a pretext for US expansionism; perhaps to avoid offending his friend Roosevelt, Riis refused the offer of good payment to investigate this and made nationalist statements.

== Criticism ==
While the impact of Riis's work on social reform is undeniable, Riis's own biases, especially against Jewish immigrants, are also present in his work. His audience included middle-class reformers, and critics say that he had no love for the traditional lifestyles of the people he portrayed. Stange (1989) argues that Riis "recoiled from workers and working-class culture" and appealed primarily to the anxieties and fears of his middle-class audience. Riis portrayed a widespread fear among Anglo-Saxons that America was quickly changing as a result of the influx of immigrants, and that “American family values” were fading.

Riis has been criticized for allowing his Christian beliefs to affect his work. Riis's work often utilized elements of the social gospel, which at the time didn't draw criticism, but current critics note that this framework led to some of his biases against immigrant populations. In 2008, Swienty wrote, "Riis was quite impatient with most of his fellow immigrants; he was quick to judge and condemn those who failed to assimilate, and he did not refrain from expressing his contempt." Riis's photography is also criticized for representing immigrant groups as monochromatic.

Some critics have questioned his right to interfere with the lives and choices of others. Libertarian economist Thomas Sowell (2001) argues that immigrants during Riis's time were typically willing to live in cramped, unpleasant circumstances as a deliberate short-term strategy that allowed them to save more than half their earnings to help family members come to America, with every intention of relocating to more comfortable lodgings eventually. Many tenement renters physically resisted the well-intentioned relocation efforts of reformers like Riis, Sowell states, because other lodgings were too costly to permit the high rate of savings possible in the tenements.

There were other reform attempts to relocate immigrants further outside the city, such as Williamsburg or Brownsville. These also failed, as living conditions weren't much better and those living there still had to travel into the city for work. According to Sowell, Riis's own personal experiences were the rule rather than the exception during his era: like most immigrants and low-income persons, he lived in the tenements only temporarily before gradually earning more income and relocating to different lodgings.

=== Antisemitic views ===
Riis faced criticism for his depictions of Eastern European Jews. Gurock (1981) says Riis was insensitive to the needs and fears of East European Jewish immigrants who lived in New York at this time. Fried (1997) criticizes what he calls Riis's “image of Jews as alien, exotic, unassimilable race, and a people resistant to the promises of Christian universalism." Riis's written work about the Jews invoked anti-semitic tropes such as saying “money is their god”.

Riis saw the Jews as antiquated and mysterious. He called the area of the Lower East Side with the most Jewish immigrants Jewtown, with an “omnipresent and unfathomable peddler” harking back to the trope of the Jewish usurer, and that entering a Jewish house of mourning meant “going back 2000 years”. Fried notes that as Riis gained popularity he moderated his comments about Jews however critics still point to his earlier works as influencing his biases later on in life.

The Jews weren't the only immigrant group he stereotyped in his work, in an effort to explain why these groups “hindered the growth of a uniform culture”. In Riis's books, according to some historians, "The Jews are nervous and inquisitive, the Orientals are sinister, the Italians are unsanitary." For example, early on in his career he stated that “the Chinese must go” and then 20 years later “only as regards the Asiatic we have made a flat verdict of exclusion”. Riis also criticized Italian immigrants stating that they “reproduce conditions of destitution and disorder”.

== Memorials ==
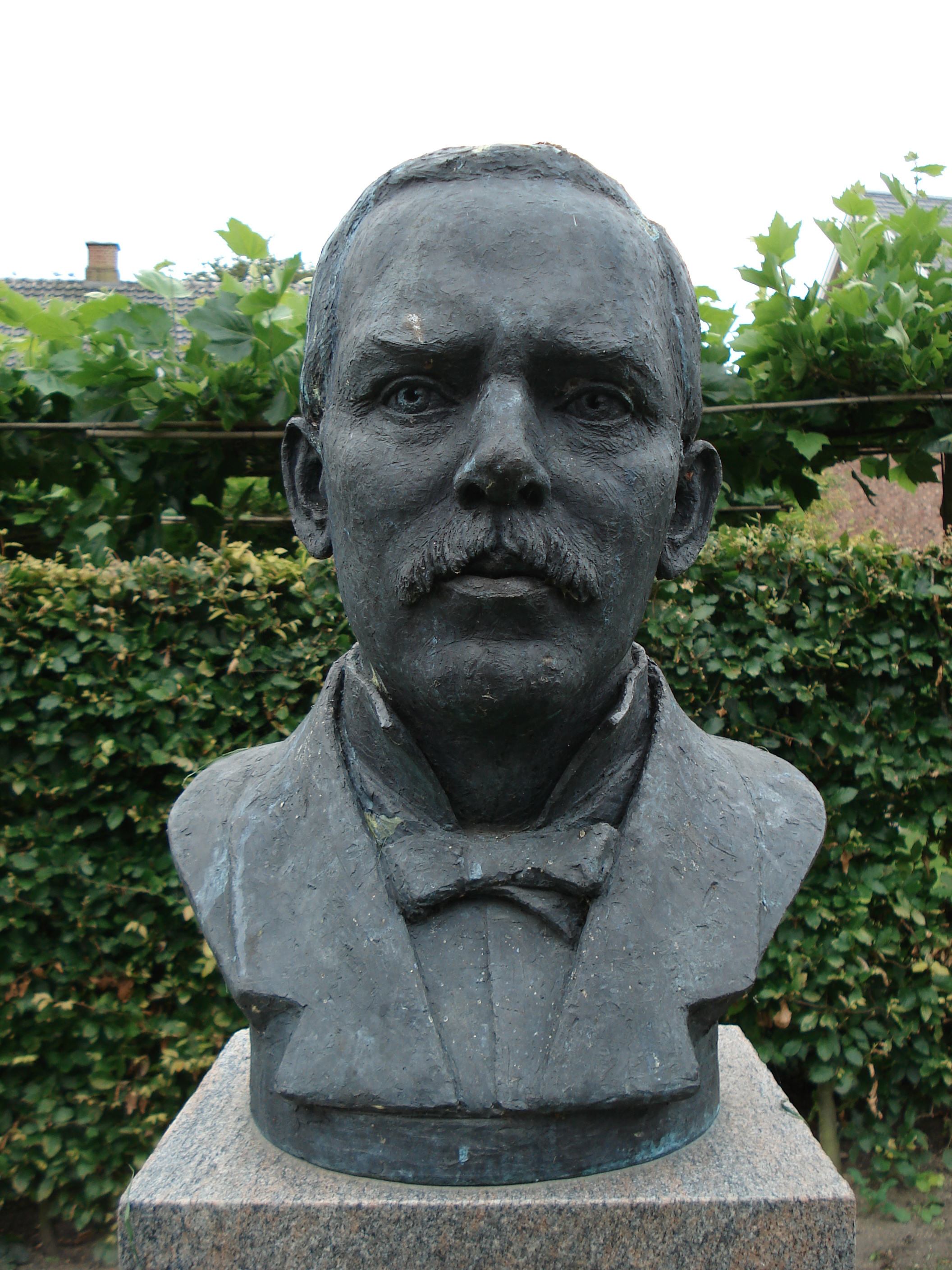
A bust of Jacob A. Riis in Ribe, Denmark

- Jacob Riis Park, located on the Rockaway Peninsula in Queens; part of the Gateway National Recreation Area of New York City and New Jersey. Designated Jacob Riis Park Historic District on the National Register of Historic Places in 1981.
- Jacob Riis Triangle, at Babbage and 116 Streets, 85 Ave, Richmond Hill, Queens
- P.S. 126 The Jacob Riis Community School, on Catherine Street in New York City, is a public PK-5 school
- From 1915 until 2002, Jacob Riis Public School on South Throop Street in Chicago was a high school operated by the Chicago School Board.
- Jacob Riis Settlement House, a multi-service community-based organization, is in the Queensbridge Houses, in Long Island City, Queens, NY.
- Jacob Riis Houses of NYCHA at Avenue D (Manhattan)
- Riis Park is on Chicago's Northwest Side in the Belmont-Cragin neighborhood. Within the park is a large stone dedicated in his honor in 1929 by the 21st Danish National Committee of Chicago.
- Jacob A. Riis Museum, Ribe, Denmark.
- Statue of Jacob A. Riis, Ribe, Denmark.
- Jacob A. Riis High School, all boys school in Los Angeles, California. Opened in 1928, renamed in 1965.

== Writings ==
=== Books ===
- How the Other Half Lives: Studies among the Tenements of New York. New York: Charles Scribner's Sons. 1890.
- The Children of the Poor. New York: Charles Scribner's Sons. 1892.
- Nibsy's Christmas. New York: Charles Scribner's Sons. 1893.
- Out of Mulberry Street: Stories of Tenement Life in New York City. New York: Century. 1896.
- A Ten Years' War: An Account of the Battle with the Slum in New York. New York: Houghton Mifflin. 1900.
- The Making of an American. New York: Macmillan. 1901. Google Books, Archive.org, LibriVox recording
- The Battle with the Slum. New York: Houghton, Mifflin. 1901.
- Children of the Tenements. New York: Houghton, Mifflin. 1903.
- The Peril and the Preservation of the Home: Being the William L. Bull Lectures for the Year 1903. Philadelphia: George W. Jacobs. 1903.
- Is There a Santa Claus?. New York: Macmillan. 1904.
- Theodore Roosevelt, the Citizen. New York: Outlook. 1904.
- The Old Town. New York: Macmillan. 1909.
- Hero Tales of the Far North. New York: Macmillan. 1910.
- Neighbors: Life Stories of the Other Half. New York: Macmillan. 1914.
- Christmas Stories. An anthology of fiction for younger readers. New York: Macmillan. 1923.

=== Other ===
- Page, Walter Hines; Page, Arthur Wilson (February 1912). "How We Found Our Farm". The World's Work: A History of Our Time. 23: 475–79.
