= The Trench in Potter's Field =

Photograph by Jacob Riis

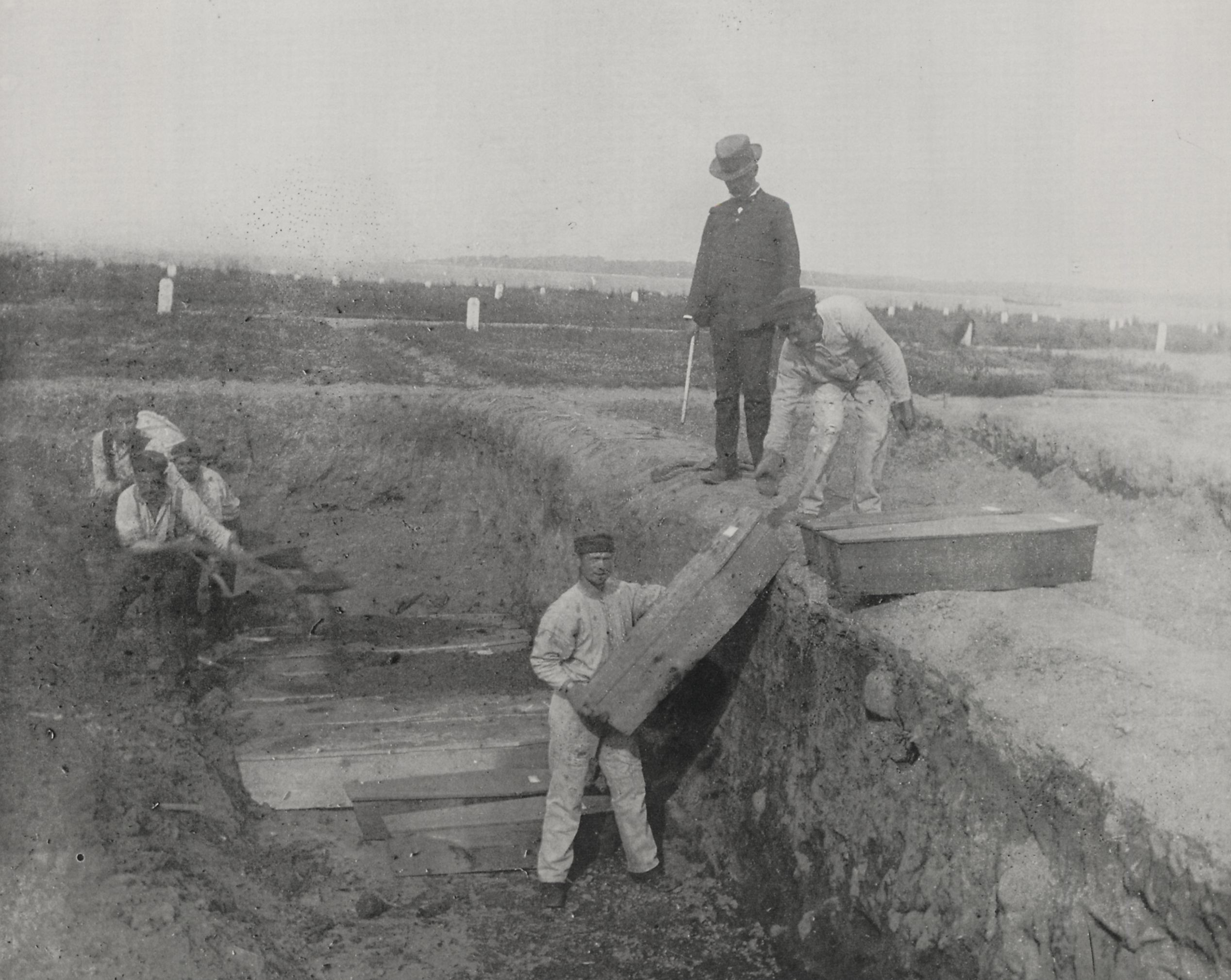
The Trench in Potter's Field (c. 1890). The photograph depicts laborers loading coffins into an open trench at the city burial ground on Hart's Island.

The Trench in Potter's Field is a black and white photograph produced by Danish-American photographer Jacob A. Riis, probably in 1890, depicting a trench used as a mass grave for tenement residents who died during the period of mass immigration in New York. This photograph was part of the larger work made by Riis to depict the conditions of the lower classes of New York in his photographic and journalistic work.

== Immigrants and economic degradation ==
In the late 19th century, masses of immigrants took shelter in tenements after passing through Ellis Island. However, due to the large influx of people immigrating to the United States, the tenement plan quickly failed. Immigrants were already faced with many challenges moving to the United States, in addition to the low economic state in which they found themselves. The people, including children, did not have the room, resources, or economic stability that they would need to survive. Soon after arriving, many were unable to afford food and other basic necessities, and thus couldn't afford to pay to live in the already-crowded tenements. The poverty throughout New York during this period caused a great number of deaths.

== Poverty and death ==
Due to the massive amount of poverty suffered by those who were living in tenements, death occurred at a rapid rate. Those who couldn't afford burial plots were buried in large communal trenches or mass graves in a potter's field on Hart's Island off the Bronx in NYC.

== Analysis ==
The picture shows six men involved in the task of burying the dead in the common trench. The picture illustrates the depth in which the trenches were created in order to accommodate the body count-nearly three stories deep. Many of the bodies were stacked on top of one another, illustrating those who cannot afford and survive. Death was a matter of impact to housing towards the immigrants. There was nowhere else to get rid of the corpses once they died, except for trenches, even if they pass away inside the tenements. The trenches were a symbol of not only the government and wealthy people's contribution (or lack thereof) to the state New York was in, but the poverty that was suffered by the other half.

== Public collections ==
There are prints of this photograph at the International Center of Photography, in New York, and at the Museum of the City of New York.
