= Street Arabs in the Area of Mulberry Street =

Photography by Jacob Riis

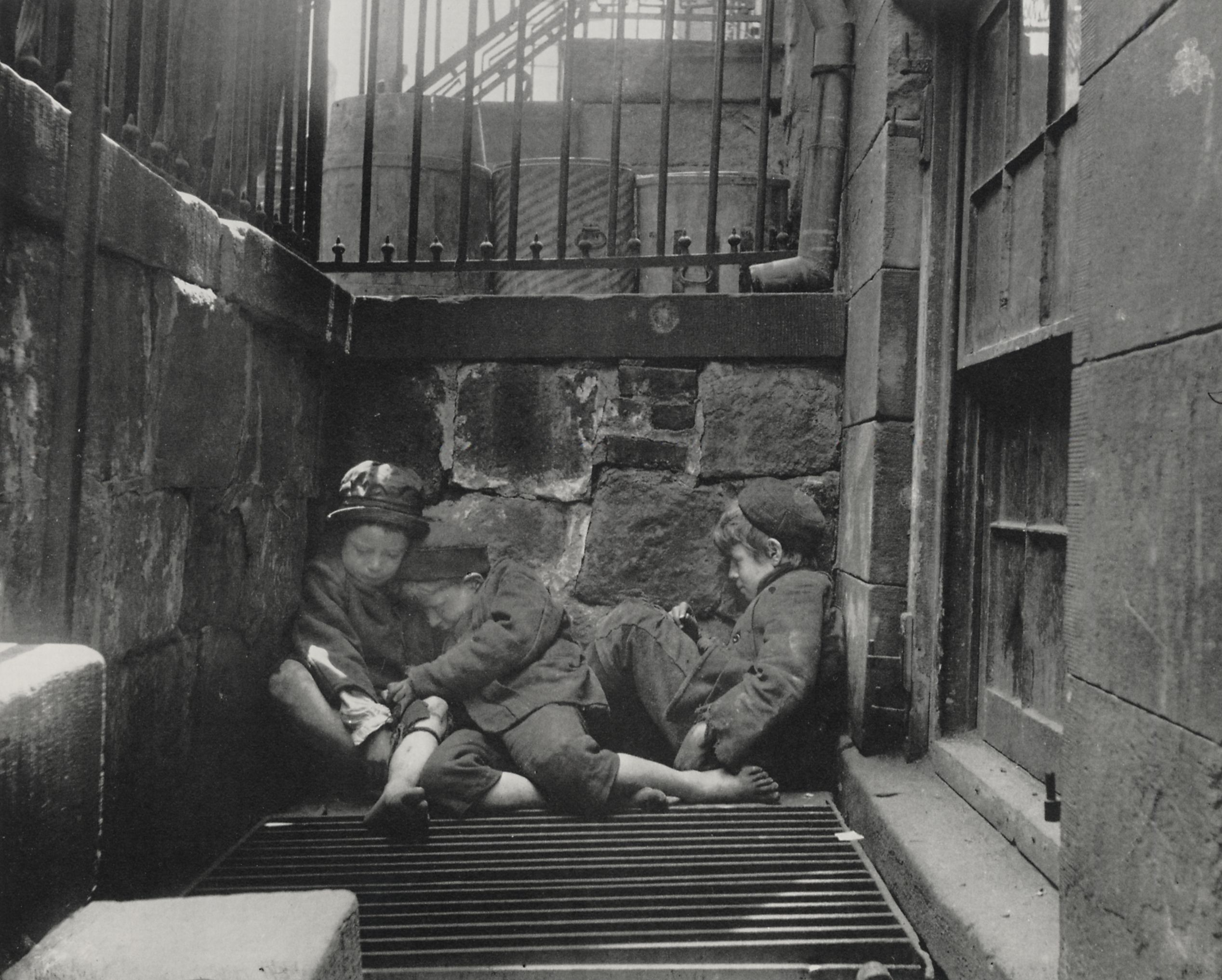
Street Arabs in the Area of Mulberry Street (c. 1890) by Jacob Riis

Street Arabs in the Area of Mulberry Street is a black and white photograph taken by Danish American photographer Jacob Riis, probably in 1890. The designation of street arabs was given back then to homeless children. Riis took several pictures of these children, during the journalistic and photographic work that led to the publication of his landmark book How the Other Half Lives (1890), where they were published with the title of Street Arabs in Sleeping Quarters.

== History and description ==
In the late 19th century, there were a large number of homeless children on the streets of New York. Some of the children who lived in the streets had homes, but preferred to sleep on the street, as their tenements were often too small, unsanitary, or overcrowded.

In the photograph, three children apparently sleep close to each other near a heated vent at the bottom floor of a tenement on Mulberry Street. The names or occupations of the children are unknown, but they seem to be very poor, judging by their clothing and from the fact that two of them are barefoot. This photograph was taken in daylight, and, similarly to others, it appears staged by the author. It nevertheless achieves his purpose to illustrate poverty and homelessness in children.

Riis used these images to attract the public interest of the upper classes of New York to the poor conditions of the lower classes and to help them to improve their condition. The photographs of poor or homeless children were often particularly poignant and moving to achieve that purpose.

== Cultural references ==
The scene depicted in the photograph was recreated in the fourth episode of the TV series The Alienist (2018), set in the late 19th century.

== Public collections ==
There is a print of this photograph at the Museum of the City of New York.
