= The Law of Civilization and Decay =

1895 book by Brooks Adams

The Law of Civilization and Decay: An Essay on History
- Title page for The Law of Civilization and Decay: An Essay on History (1897 edition)
- Author: Brooks Adams
- Language: English
- Subject: History of Western civilization
- Publisher: The Macmillan Company
- Publication date: 1895
- Publication place: United States
- Pages: 416
- OCLC: 3910923
- LC Class: D16.9 .A2 1897

The Law of Civilization and Decay: An Essay on History is a work of history written by Brooks Adams and privately published in 1895. His intention was to prove that the rise and fall of civilizations follows a definite cycle of centralization and decay. Adams outlined this theory by sketching the patterns of major periods in western history, concentrating on economic and social factors.

In the book, Adams argues that social "movement," as in colonization and industrialization, led to consolidation; consolidation, in turn, creates a comparative advantage for frugality versus artistic expression. Because Adams believed that these traits of the mind were heritable, he argues that consolidation led to the domination of one people over another, and the domination of one civilization over another. The successive rises and falls of empires were therefore dictated by their stage in this cycle relative to other empires, by which commercial centers moved from one city to another:

"In proportion as movement accelerates, societies consolidate, and as societies consolidate, they pass through a profound intellectual change. Energy ceases to find vent through the imagination and takes the form of capital; hence as civilizations advance, the imaginative temperament tends to disappear, while the economic instinct is fostered and thus substantially new varieties of men come to possess the world.

Nothing so portentous overhangs humanity as this mysterious and relentless acceleration of movement, which changes methods of competition and alters paths of trade; for by it countless millions of men and women are foredoomed to happiness or misery as certainly as the beasts and trees, which have flourished in the wilderness, are destined to vanish when the soil is subdued by man.

The Romans amassed the treasure by which they administered their Empire, through the plunder and enslavement of the world. The Empire cemented by that treasure crumbled when adverse exchanges carried the bullion of Italy to the shore of the Bosphorus. An accelerated movement among the semi-barbarians of the West caused the agony of the Crusades, amidst which Constantinople fell as the Italian cities rose; while Venice and Genoa, and with them the whole Arabic civilization, shriveled when Portugal established direct communication with Hindoostan.

The opening of the ocean as a highroad precipitated the Reformation and built up Antwerp, while in the end it ruined Spain; and finally the last great quickening of the age of steam, which centralized the world at London, bathed the earth in blood from the Mississippi to the Ganges. Thus religions are preached and are forgotten, empires rise and fall, philosophies are born and die, art and poetry bloom and fade, as societies pass from the disintegration wherein imagination kindles to the consolidation whose pressure ends in death."

—The Law of Civilization and Decay (1896)

Modern historians have compared The Law of Civilization and Decay to the later, longer works Decline of the West (1918) by Oswald Spengler and A Study of History (1934–61) by Arnold Toynbee.

== Background and publication ==
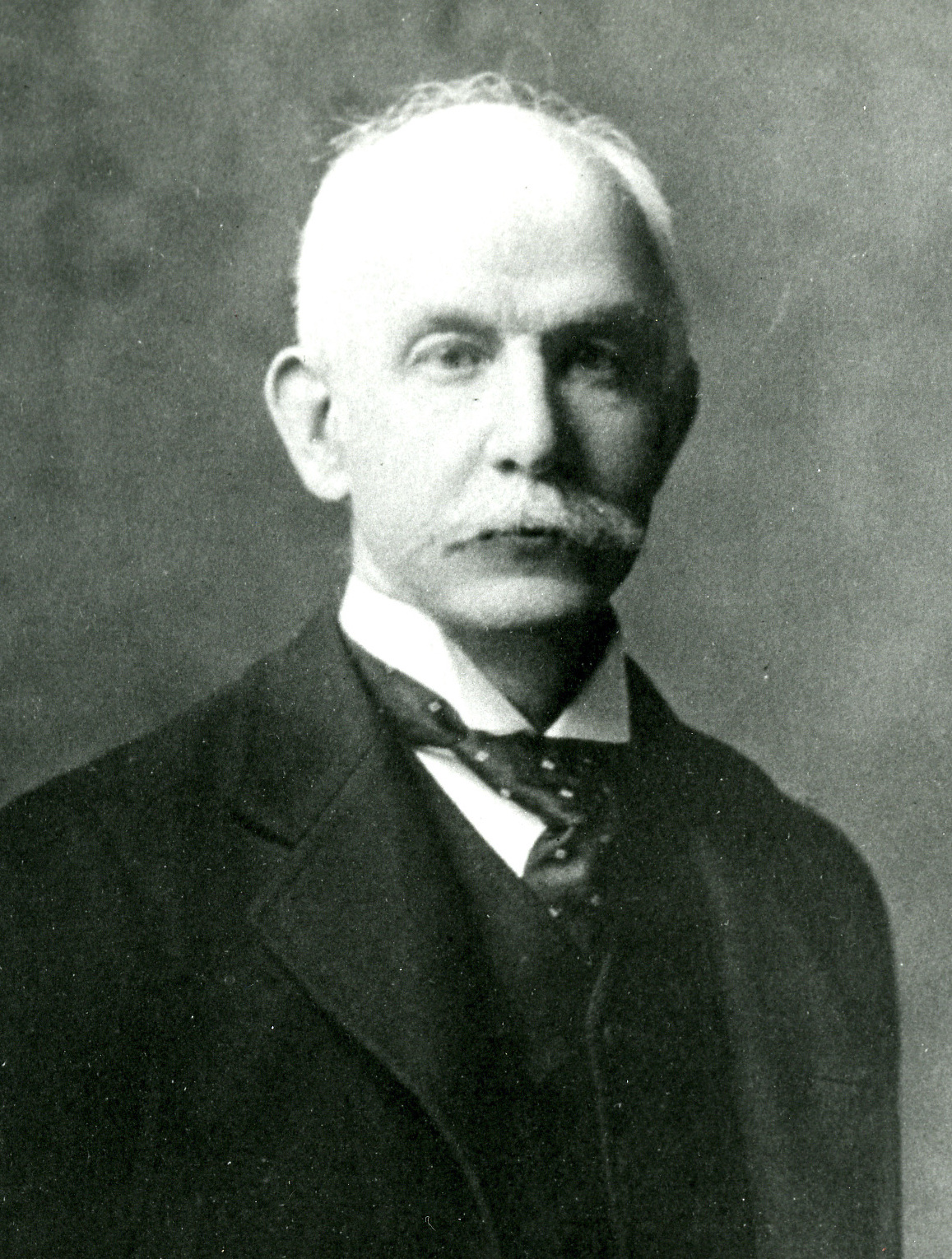
Brooks Adams (pictured c. 1910) was a member of the Adams political family and the younger brother of historian Henry Adams.

In 1887, Brooks Adams published his first full-length work, The Emancipation of Massachusetts, in which he reviewed colonial Massachusetts history from a liberal social Darwinist perspective and criticized earlier conservative histories by John G. Palfrey and Henry Martyn Dexter. Writing to Henry Cabot Lodge, Adams framed the book as an effort "to follow out the action of the human mind as we do the human body. I believe they are one and subject to the same laws. ... The story I look on as only an illustration of a law." The Emancipation had been inspired by the author's brother, Henry Adams, and Oliver Wendell Holmes Jr., who had each developed comprehensive theories of social development (in American history and law, respectively) using the scientific method. Although the book was poorly received, particularly in conservative Boston society, Adams defended it as an illustration of general laws of history rather than a true work of historical narrative. Adams biographer Arthur Beringause concurred with this assessment, arguing that the historical narrative was "doctored to express ideas and prejudices of the author," but that the book was nevertheless "valuable for its having laughed the filiopietistic school out of court, for its exposure of the political machinations of the clergy in early New England, and for its looking at the drama of Massachusetts history from a world view."

Following The Emancipation, Adams sought to express his philosophy of history more generally in his second work, without the restraint of historical details. In an 1887 letter to William James, he hinted at the topic of his next book. "The deepest passion of the human mind is fear," Adams wrote. "Fear of the unseen, the spiritual world, represented by the priest; fear of the tangible world, represented by the soldier. It is the conflict between these forces which has made civilisation." After researching religious history in Europe and visiting again for his honeymoon, he presented a partial manuscript to his brother Henry in 1893, and they spent a month revising its language together.

Meanwhile, the Panic of 1893 had shaken Adams's belief in hard currency, and he became interested in the effect of the money supply on social institutions, influenced by the work of James Laurence Laughlin and fears of a monetary conspiracy. He published a portion of his manuscript as "The Gold Standard", a brief essay in which he "erected a philosophy of history based on the vicissitudes of men and events in the grip of an ever narrowing gold currency." The work is influenced by his brother Henry's earlier essay, "The New York Gold Conspiracy," and by Archibald Alison's History of Europe (1833–42), which attributed the fall of Rome to the decline of silver mines in Spain and Greece.

The complete manuscript was published privately in 1895. The first print sold out within three months in England. Under the guidance of Henry Adams, a limited circulation of 250 copies was distributed in the United States. Notable first edition recipients included:

- United States Secretary of State Richard Olney
- Associate Justice of the Supreme Court John Marshall Harlan
- future Associate Justice Oliver Wendell Holmes Jr.
- Speaker of the House Thomas Brackett Reed (who reportedly pessimistically agreed with Adams's thesis)
- Future President Theodore Roosevelt
- Senator Henry Cabot Lodge
- William Astor Chanler
- J. P. Morgan (to whom Chanler forwarded the book, with the understanding that he was the "enemy")

Within the year, three bulk American orders had been placed.

During the Spanish-American War, as Adams grew politically influential through his connections to Theodore Roosevelt and Henry Cabot Lodge, The Law of Civilization and Decay received widespread publication in New York and Paris. This edition considerably expanded on the first draft but retained its essentially pessimistic tone on the future of European civilization. Nevertheless, Adams already believed it to be out of date, as the American victory at Manila Bay had heralded a new age and new American empire, which would become the focus of his next work.

== Synopsis ==
Throughout The Law of Civilization and Decay, Adams observes that as new population centers emerged, the center of world trade shifted in a predictable cycle, from Constantinople to Venice to Amsterdam to London in a predictable cycle. First, masses of people drew together in large population centers to engage in commerce. As desire for wealth grew, they discarded spiritual and creative values. Greed led to distrust and dishonesty, and the social order eventually crumbled when a new, more economically energetic society took its place. In connecting the history of civilization to relative levels of human activity, Adams developed a complete theory of history incorporating Darwinist approaches to war and race suicide and a binary theory of human nature divided between the spiritual man driven by fear, on the one hand, and the economic man driven by greed, on the other. In Adams's theory, the two tendencies within human nature would wax and wane as society develops.

=== Rome ===
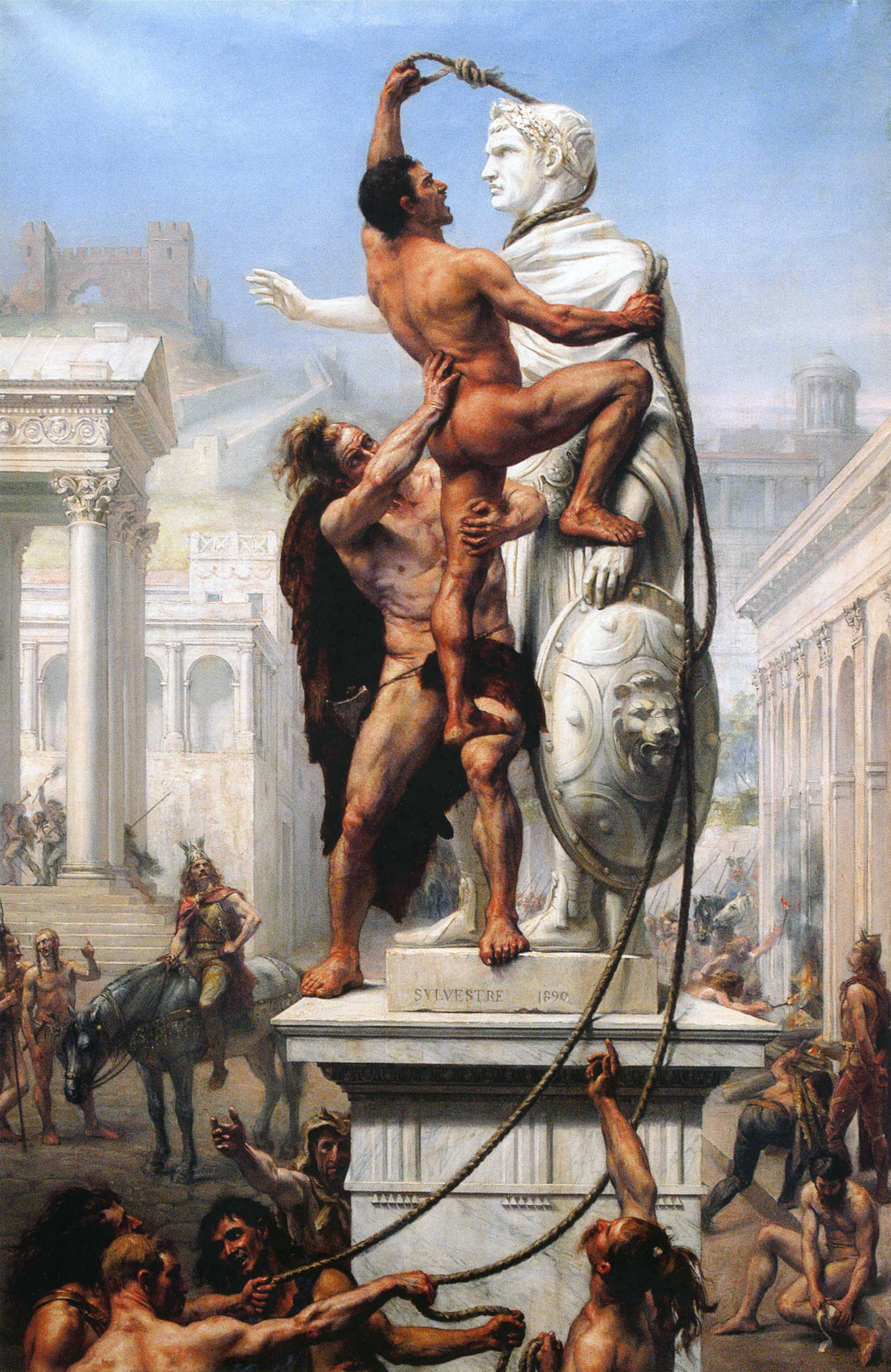
The decline and fall of the Western Roman Empire form the basis for the historical narrative.

In the Roman Republic, the wielders of government power were landowning farmers and husbandmen. The landowners, however, spent time away from home, and "were ill-fitted to endure the strain of the unrestricted economic competition of a centralized society. Consequently, their conquests had hardly consolidated before decay set in.

Adams's concept of Roman decay is characterized by the rise of slavery within the Republic and, later, the Roman Empire. The landowners originally hired free men to work their land, generally very poor, so their debts to the landowners increased dramatically throughout the years. Sons would take on their father’s debts, which became so usurious that perpetual bondage to a landowner was the result. The entire system, judicial and fiscal, was thus structured around creating and maintaining debt. Usurers, through the courts, could buy, sell, and execute debtors, a system which slowly decreased capital and undermined the ability of the landowner to pay taxes and of the Republican to collect revenue. Income was supplemented through conquest, but military expansion could only delay the decline.

Adams then argues that increasing centralization, through the rise of the Emperors, exacerbated class divisions between plebeian and publican, slave and free. As territory was added, the number of foreigners reduced to slavery in Italy increased, forming a hierarchy that had not existed under the Republic. This source of cheap labor doomed, increased the concentration of capital in the hands of a few, and landowners had barely enough to subsist, even in good times. At the slightest disaster, he was reduced to bankruptcy and debt. In Adams's words, "The Roman husbandman and soldier was doomed, for nature had turned against him; the task of history is but to ascertain his fate and trace the fortunes of his country after he had gone."

Adams also blames the decline of Rome on the devaluation and centralization of the currency. Under the Emperors, coins were minted without real value, causing inflation and devaluation. The death knell for Roman power and influence occurred in AD 325 when Constantine moved the capital of the Empire to Constantinople. From then on, the Empire would be dependent on its far holdings for money, supplies, food, workers, slaves, and even emperors. Bankers and the moneyed elite replaced the citizen-soldier landholder, and mercenaries replaced the once-great Roman Legions. The western half of the Roman Empire itself declined until its last Emperor, Romulus Augustus, was deposed by barbarians in the fifth century AD.

=== Middle Ages ===
Adams proceeds from Rome to the Middle Ages, during which nomadic barbarians (primarily Germanic) settled and established kingdoms in the former Roman provinces of Gaul, Iberia and Italy. The small kingdoms were soon at war. Initially, these kingdoms, unlike the Empire, were able to support themselves. The cost was a loss of technology, and a temporary lapse of high civilization into the "Dark Ages". Christianity came to wield enormous power and wealth through the power of priests and the use of miracles until, by 1200, the Pope had far more power than any secular ruler.

Overall, Adams describes the Middle Ages as a period of decentralization in Europe, where feudalism and manorialism, rather than nationalism, bound the people. Superstition and the "imaginative mind" gained preeminence. By 1095, the beginnings of Europe's modern nation-states could be discerned; controlled, often not willingly, by the Catholic Church. European society remained stagnant, as defensible fortresses preserved decentralized pockets of authority.

"Until the mechanical arts have advanced far enough to cause the attack in war to predominate over the defence, centralization cannot begin …"

The First Crusade represents the first steps toward centralization in Western Europe, as religious fervor created the means for military innovation and economic invigoration. The "opening" of the Holy Land brought economic capital, cultural renaissance, and trade to the West. The renewed trade with the East allowed new imports (such as silk and spices) and a new market for European exports, encouraged centralization, and fueled tension between Church and the local governments. The local governments began to target Church wealth in the form of monasteries, which often contained great hoards of tangible wealth. The Reformation emboldened secular monarchs to intimidate, coerce or abolish the monasteries to obtain their wealth, and this redistribution eventually led to the secular monarchies predominating over the Holy See.

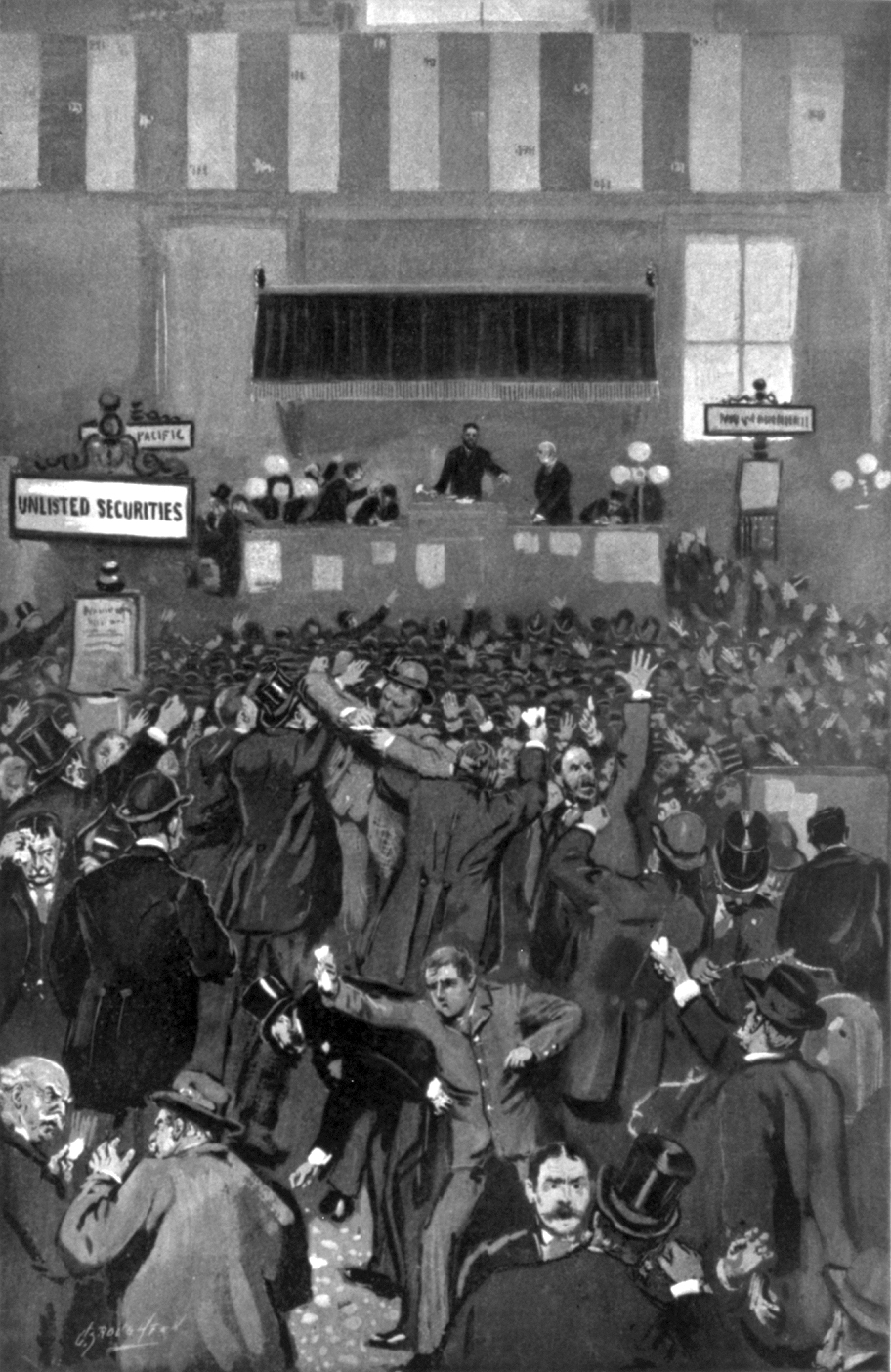
Writing amid financial crisis, Adams concludes that consolidation would, through global labor arbitrage, result in the "destruction ... of the less tenacious organisms."

=== Modernity ===
From the Reformation onward, power is centralized in the modern secular state through the exponential processes of colonization and industrialization. Trade with colonies invariably favored the mother country, and control over the colonies was absolute. The Industrial Revolution encouraged a mass movement of people into the cities, thereby concentrating the labor force.

Despite these apparent advantages, Adams shows how these imperial states had already fallen by 1895 through economic decay. As centralization and industry increased, so too did the power of bankers and the "self-interested" competition of the free market. This economic system could not support these overseas empires indefinitely, and they were slowly dismantled as the disadvantages began to outweigh the advantages. Adams concludes that the decentralization of power will lead to the destruction of less economic societies through competition:

"Such signs point to the climax of consolidation. And yet, even the rise of the bankers is not the only or the surest indication that centralization is culminating. The destruction, wrought by accelerated movement, of the less tenacious organisms, is more evident below than above, is more striking in the advance of cheap labor, than in the evolution of the financier."

== Reception ==
=== Contemporary reception ===
Theodore Roosevelt, a friend of Adams then serving as New York City Police Commissioner, gave the book a mostly positive review in the Forum, though he "emphatically dissented" from portions of its thesis. Roosevelt's review received a negative response from Charles Anderson Dana of the New York Sun.

Professional reviewers were much more critical than Roosevelt, as were others in the author's social circle. Cecil Spring Rice wrote to Roosevelt and Elizabeth Sherman Cameron with derision regarding Adams's "discovery" and about historical theory generally. Holmes, who had influenced Adams's thinking, recommended the book to Sir Frederick Pollock, calling it "about the most (immediately) interesting history I ever read," though "it hardly strikes me science, but rather as a grotesque world poem."

Early popular characterizations of the book were as a piece of bimetallist propaganda, owing to Adams's previous work The Gold Standard and his activism on currency issues. It was mentioned in at least two contemporary lists of works on the currency question.

=== Legacy ===
Adams's biographer Arthur Beringause lauded The Law of Civilization and Decay as "a magnificent book, daring in conception and brilliant in execution," while reserving criticism for Adams's "outmoded" race theory and personal insecurities. Beringause positions the book as a corrective to Edward Gibbon and Karl Marx and a precedent for the works of Max Weber, Thorstein Veblen, Charles A. Beard, and Oswald Spengler.

Modern historians have compared The Law of Civilization and Decay to the later, longer works Decline of the West (1918) by Oswald Spengler and A Study of History (1934–61) by Arnold Toynbee.
