= Mary Louise Phillips =

- Born: Nottingham, UK
- Citizenship: US
- Education: Cambridge University
- Scientific career
- Workplaces: University of Pittsburgh Medical Center

Mary Louise Phillips is a Distinguished Professor in Psychiatry and Clinical and Translational Science, a Pittsburgh Foundation Emmerling Endowed Chair in Psychotic Disorders, Director of the Center for Neural Circuit-Based Technology Interventions in Psychiatry and the Center for Research in Translational and Developmental Affective Neuroscience, Director of the Collaborative on Mood Disorders Research, and Director of the Mood and Brain Laboratory - Department of Psychiatry, University of Pittsburgh. As the director of the Mood and Brain Laboratory, Phillips performs neuroimaging research designed to elucidate the neuropathophysiological basis of bipolar disorders and associated behavioral traits.

== Education ==
Phillips obtained her medical education and training at the University of Cambridge, the Maudsley Hospital, and the Institute of Psychiatry in London. Her early research training was earned through a Medical Research Council (UK) fellowship.

== Research ==
Phillips research interests span multimodal imaging techniques; abnormalities in brain function, structure, and white matter; and biomarkers for risk of psychiatric disorders. She has published the findings of her research in over 200 peer-reviewed articles in top journals including JAMA Psychiatry, Molecular Psychiatry, and Biological Psychiatry. Her research has received international recognition through grant award funding from the National Institute of Mental Health (US), Medical Research Council (UK), and Wellcome Trust (UK). and honors such as the University of Pittsburgh Chancellor's Distinguished Research Awards, Colvin Prize for Outstanding Achievement in Mood Disorders Research, Joel Elkes Research Award, and the Clarivate Analytics 2018 Highly Cited Researchers list.

Phillips is President of the Society of Biological Psychiatry (2019), Scientific Council Member of Brain & Behavior Research Foundation (2016), and Elected Member of the American Society for Clinical Investigation. She was elected a Member of the National Academy of Medicine in 2024.

== Mentorship ==
Phillips mentors and trains future scientists in their pursuit of psychiatric neuroscience research careers. Her mentees have included psychiatry residents, medical scientist training program students, postdoctoral scholars, and young investigators. In addition, she is a steering committee member of the Society of Biological Psychiatry's Women's Leadership Group, which aims to support and advance the careers of women scientists.

== Popular press ==
Phillips' research has been internationally featured in a variety of media outlets, including the BBC, LA Times, and PBS.
