= Mary Phillips Riis =

American philanthropist

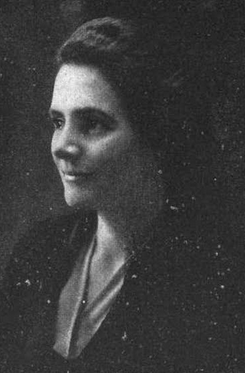
- Mary Phillips Riis, from a 1920 magazine profile.
- Born: Mary A. Phillips; April 29, 1877; Memphis, Tennessee, US
- Died: August 4, 1967 (aged 90); New York City, US
- Occupations: Philanthropist, financier
- Spouse: Jacob Riis (married 1907)

Mary A. Phillips Riis (April 29, 1877 – August 4, 1967) was an American philanthropist, widow of Danish-American reformer and journalist Jacob Riis.

== Early life ==
Mary A. Phillips was born in Memphis, Tennessee, the daughter of Richard Fabian Phillips and Elise Caroline (Lina) Rensch Phillips. Her father was born in England, a cotton broker, and eventually president of the Cotton Exchange in St. Louis. She attended schools in England and France. Later in life, she took courses at New York University.

== Career ==
Mary Phillips moved to New York for a career on the stage. She became secretary, and later wife, to journalist Jacob A. Riis. In widowhood, she took a job on Wall Street, selling bonds. During World War I she helped promote Liberty Loans. In 1919, she became head of an investment securities office, the first in New York City to be staffed entirely by women. She built a fortune enough to own a mansion near Bedford Village, New York. In 1958 she was dubbed "The First Lady of Wall Street" in a newspaper headline.

Riis taught investment courses at Columbia University, meant for women students who, like herself, were faced with managing their own personal finances. She also wrote about finance for women's magazines, and counseled women in business.

She was longtime president of Riis House, a settlement house in New York. She supported Franklin Roosevelt's New Deal programs during the Great Depression, and encouraged Roosevelt to do more for Jewish refugees from Germany. Late in life, she worked especially for children's programs, including playgrounds.

== Personal life ==
Mary Phillips married widower Jacob Riis in 1907, as his second wife. They lived on a farm in New England, which she inherited, while the rest of the Riis estate was divided among his children. She was widowed after seven years, in 1914. She died in a nursing home in New York City in 1967, aged 90 years. Some of her papers are in the Jacob A. Riis Papers at the New York Public Library. She donated another collection of Riis papers and photographs to the Library of Congress.
