= Josiah Strong =

American clergyman (1847-1916)

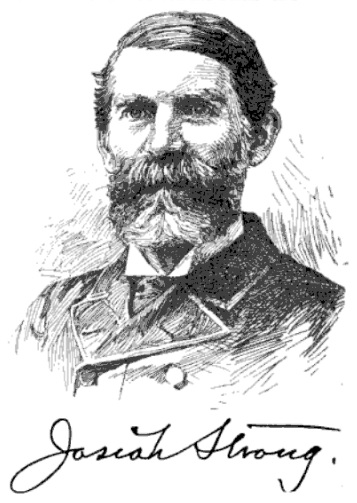
Josiah Strong, from Book News, 1893

Josiah Strong (January 19, 1847 – April 28, 1916) was an American Protestant clergyman, organizer, editor, and author. He was a leader of the Social Gospel movement, calling for social justice and combating social evils. He supported missionary work so that all races could be improved and uplifted and thereby brought to Christ. He is controversial, however, due to his beliefs about race and methods of converting people to Christianity. In his 1885 book Our Country, Strong argued that Anglo-Saxons are a superior race who must "Christianize and civilize" the "savage" races, which he argued would be good for the American economy and the "lesser races".

== Early life ==
Josiah Strong was born in Naperville, Illinois on January 19, 1847. His family moved to Hudson, Ohio when he was a child. He graduated from Western Reserve College in 1869, then attended Lane Seminary, where he was ordained a minister of the Congregational Church in 1871.

== Ministry ==
Josiah Strong was one of the founders of the Social Gospel movement that sought to apply Protestant religious principles to solve the social ills brought on by industrialization, urbanization and immigration. He served as General Secretary (1886–1898) of the Evangelical Alliance for the United States, a coalition of Protestant missionary groups. After being forced out he set up his own group, the League for Social Service (1898–1916), and edited its magazine The Gospel of the Kingdom. The League was later expanded to become the American Institute of Social Service, based on the concept of the Musée social.

Strong, like most other leaders of the Social Gospel movement, added strong evangelical roots, including a belief in sin and redemption. Strong, like Walter Rauschenbusch and George D. Herron had an intense conversion experience and believed that regeneration was necessary to bring social justice by combating social sin. Though they were often critical of evangelicalism, they thought of their mission as an expansion of it. Their primitivist desire for noninstitutional Christianity was influenced by liberal, postmillennial idealism, and their attitudes influenced neo-orthodox theologian Reinhold Niebuhr.

His best-known and most influential work was Our Country: Its Possible Future and Its Present Crisis (1885), intended to promote domestic missionary activity in the American West. When the work appeared, Protestants had long been accustomed to meeting the sorts of perils that Strong saw threatening the country's survival, Christianization, and world greatness. His work flowed from a tradition habituated to perceive threats to "our country". It was a tradition that helped ensure the end of slavery in defense of the Union during the Civil War, while also predisposing many northern Protestants to look past, if not entirely forget, the ex-slaves following the war. Historians also suggest it may have encouraged support for imperialistic United States policy among American Protestants. He pleaded as well for more missionary work in the nation's cities, and for reconciliation to end racial conflict. He was one of the first to warn that Protestants (most of whom lived in rural areas or small towns) were ignoring the problems of the cities and the working classes

Strong believed that all races could be improved and uplifted and thereby brought to Christ. In the "Possible Future" portion of Our Country, Strong focused on the "Anglo-Saxon race"—that is the English language speakers. He said in 1890: "In 1700 this race numbered less than 6,000,000 souls. In 1800, Anglo-Saxons (I use the term somewhat broadly to include all English-speaking peoples) had increased to about 20,500,000, and now, in 1890, they number more than 120,000,000.)" had a responsibility to "civilize and Christianize" the world, sharing their technology and knowledge of Christianity. The "Crisis" portion of the text described the seven "perils" facing the nation: Catholicism, Mormonism, Socialism, Intemperance, Wealth, Urbanization, and Immigration. Conservative Protestants, by contrast, argued that missionaries should spend their time preaching the Gospel; they allowed for charitable activity, but argued that it did not actually save souls.

In 1891 a revised edition was issued based on the census of 1890. The large increase in immigration during this period led him to conclude that the perils he outlined in the first edition had only grown.

The term Anglo-Saxon before 1900 was often used as a synonym for people of English descent throughout the world. Strong said in 1890: "In 1700 this race numbered less than 6,000,000 souls. In 1800, Anglo-Saxons (I use the term somewhat broadly to include all English-speaking peoples) had increased to about 20,500,000, and now, in 1890, they number more than 120,000,000". In 1893 Strong suggested, "This race is destined to dispossess many weaker ones, assimilated others, and mold of the remainder until ... it has Anglo-Saxonized mankind."

Strong argued that, "The Anglo-Saxon is the representative of two great ideas, which are closely related. One of them is that of civil liberty. Nearly all of the civil liberty of the world is enjoyed by Anglo-Saxons: the English, the British colonists, and the people of the United States. ... The other great idea of which the Anglo-Saxon is the exponent is that of a pure spiritual Christianity." He went on, "It follows, then, that the Anglo-Saxon, as the great representative of these two ideas, the depositary of these two greatest blessings, sustains peculiar relations to the world's future, is divinely commissioned to be, in a peculiar sense, his brother's keeper."

Strong died at Roosevelt Hospital in Manhattan on April 28, 1916.

== Works ==
- Our Country: Its Possible Future and Its Present Crisis (New York: The American Home Missionary Society, 1885.
- The United States and the Future of the Anglo-Saxon Race, 1889.
- The New Era; or, The Coming Kingdom, 1893.
- "Address of Rev. Dr. Josiah Strong", The American Missionary. December 1895 Volume 49, Issue 12, pp. 423-424
- The Twentieth Century City, New York: Baker and Taylor (published 1898), 1970
- Expansion Under New World-Conditions. New York: Baker & Taylor, 1900.
- Religious Movements for Social Betterment. New York: Baker & Taylor, 1900.
- The Times and Young Men. New York: Baker & Taylor, 1901.
- The Next Great Awakening. New York: Baker & Taylor, 1902.
- The Challenge of the City. New York: Baker & Taylor, 1907.
- My Religion in Everyday Life. New York: Baker & Taylor, 1910.
- Our World: The New World Life. New York: Doubleday, Page & Co., 1913-14.
- Our World: The New World-Religion. New York: Doubleday, Page & Co., 1915.
